= Kuzyk =

Kuzyk is a Slavic surname. Notable people with the name include:

- Denys Kuzyk (born 2002), Ukrainian footballer
- Ken Kuzyk (born 1953), Canadian ice-hockey player
- Mark G. Kuzyk (born 1958), American physicist
- Mimi Kuzyk (born 1952), Canadian actress
- Orest Kuzyk (born 1995), Ukrainian footballer
- Roman Kuzyk (born 1989), Ukrainian footballer
