= Hyperpolarizability =

The hyperpolarizability, a nonlinear-optical property of a molecule, is the second order electric susceptibility per unit volume. The hyperpolarizability can be calculated using quantum chemical calculations developed in several software packages. See nonlinear optics.

== Definition and higher orders ==
The linear electric polarizability $\alpha$ in isotropic media is defined as the ratio of the induced dipole moment $\mathbf{p}$ of an atom to the electric field $\mathbf{E}$ that produces this dipole moment.

Therefore, the dipole moment is:
$$\mathbf{p}=\alpha  \mathbf{E}$$

In an isotropic medium $\mathbf{p}$ is in the same direction as $\mathbf{E}$, i.e. $\alpha$ is a scalar. In an anisotropic medium $\mathbf{p}$ and $\mathbf{E}$ can be in different directions and the polarisability is now a tensor.

The total density of induced polarization is the product of the number density of molecules multiplied by the dipole moment of each molecule, i.e.:

$$\mathbf{P} = \rho \mathbf{p} = \rho \alpha \mathbf{E} = \varepsilon_0  \chi \mathbf{E},$$

where $\rho$ is the concentration, $\varepsilon_0$ is the vacuum permittivity, and $\chi$ is the electric susceptibility.

In a nonlinear optical medium, the polarization density is written as a series expansion in powers of the applied electric field, and the coefficients are termed the non-linear susceptibility:

$$\mathbf{P}(t) = \varepsilon_0 \left( \chi^{(1)} \mathbf{E}(t) + \chi^{(2)} \mathbf{E}^2(t) + \chi^{(3)} \mathbf{E}^3(t) + \ldots \right),$$

where the coefficients χ^{(n)} are the n-th-order susceptibilities of the medium, and the presence of such a term is generally referred to as an n-th-order nonlinearity. In isotropic media $\chi^{(n)}$ is zero for even n, and is a scalar for odd n. In general, χ^{(n)} is an (n + 1)-th-rank tensor. It is natural to perform the same expansion for the non-linear molecular dipole moment:

$$\mathbf{p}(t) = \alpha^{(1)} \mathbf{E}(t) + \alpha^{(2)} \mathbf{E}^2(t) + \alpha^{(3)} \mathbf{E}^3(t) + \cdots  ,$$

i.e. the n-th-order susceptibility for an ensemble of molecules is simply related to the n-th-order hyperpolarizability for a single molecule by:

$$\alpha^{(n)} = \frac{\varepsilon_0}{\rho} \chi^{(n)} .$$

With this definition $\alpha^{(1)}$ is equal to $\alpha$ defined above for the linear polarizability. Often $\alpha^{(2)}$ is given the symbol $\beta$ and $\alpha^{(3)}$ is given the symbol $\gamma$. However, care is needed because some authors take out the factor $\varepsilon_0$ from $\alpha^{(n)}$, so that $\mathbf{p} = \varepsilon_0 \sum_n \alpha^{(n)} \mathbf{E}^n$ and hence $\alpha^{(n)}=\chi^{(n)}/\rho$, which is convenient because then the (hyper-)polarizability may be accurately called the (nonlinear-)susceptibility per molecule, but at the same time inconvenient because of the inconsistency with the usual linear polarisability definition above.

== See also ==
- Intrinsic hyperpolarizability
