= Kuzyk quantum gap =

The Kuzyk quantum gap is a discrepancy between the maximum value of the nonlinear-optical susceptibility allowed by quantum mechanics and the highest values actually observed in real molecules. The highest possible value (in theory) is known as the Kuzyk limit, after its discoverer Mark G. Kuzyk.

== Background ==
In 2000, Professor Mark G. Kuzyk of Washington State University calculated the fundamental limit of the nonlinear-optical susceptibility of molecules. The nonlinear susceptibility is a measure of how strongly light interacts with matter. As such, these results can be used to predict the maximum attainable efficiency of various types of optical devices.

For example, Kuzyk's theory can be used to estimate how efficiently optical information can be manipulated in an optical fiber (based on the Kerr effect), which in turn is related to the amount of information that a fiber-optic system can handle. In effect, the speed limit of the internet is intimately linked to the Kuzyk limit.

One peculiar finding is that all molecules that have ever been measured appear to fall below the Kuzyk limit by about a factor of 30. This factor-of-thirty gap between the fundamental limit and the best molecules is called the Kuzyk quantum gap. Nobody understands the cause of this gap, but there is no reason to believe that it is of a fundamental nature. It is therefore likely that new approaches to synthetic chemistry may find ways to make better molecules. While the gap is breachable, the Kuzyk limit is not. Given that the Kuzyk limit is based directly on quantum mechanics, a breaching of the limit would mean that there are problems with quantum theory.

== Applications ==
Recently, researchers have been using nanotechnology to link molecules together to increase the nonlinear susceptibility. Since the connected molecules have more electrons, collective motions of these electrons yield enhanced nonlinear response. Since calculations show that the Kuzyk limit increases faster than linearly, it is best to link together as many molecules as possible. Researchers have made a material of interconnected fullerenes that appear to breach the Kuzyk quantum gap. However, if all electrons are correctly counted, then the gap may not have been breached. In either case, the absolute value of the nonlinearity achieved is impressive, and these kinds of materials may some day supercharge the internet.

The nonlinear susceptibility is the fundamental material property that is the basis of many other important applications. Nonlinear optical materials can be used to convert light to shorter (bluer) wavelengths, which can be focused to a smaller spot size (the minimum possible beam size is proportional to the wavelength.) Shorter wavelength light sources would hence yield higher density optical recording media (such as DVDs and CDs). Other applications include tunable light sources, image recognition systems and adaptive optics.

Kuzyk's calculations can be used to predict the behavior of optical devices, guide synthetic chemists to make better materials, and to gain a deeper understanding of how light interacts with matter. This process is leading to many advances in new material synthesis paradigms, which should make new types of photonic devices possible.

Perhaps most importantly, the Kuzyk Limit can be used to calculate the intrinsic hyperpolarizability, which is a scale invariant quantity that can be used to compare molecules of different sizes.

== See also ==
- Azobenzene
- Stilbene

== Sources and notes ==
- M. G. Kuzyk's January 2007 paper
- M. G. Kuzyk, "Fundamental limits on third-order molecular susceptibilities," Optics Letters 25, 1183 (2000).
- M. G. Kuzyk, "Physical Limits on Electronic Nonlinear Molecular Susceptibilities," Physical Review Letters 85, 1218 (2000).
- M. G. Kuzyk, "Quantum Limits of the Hyper-Rayleigh Scattering Susceptibilities," IEEE Journal on Selected Topics in Quantum Electronics 7, 774 (2001).
- M. G. Kuzyk, "Fundamental Material Limitations on Optical Devices," Circuits and Devices 19 (5), 8 (2003).
- M. G. Kuzyk "Fundamental limits on two-photon absorption cross-sections," Journal of Chemical Physics 119, 8327 (2003).
- M. G. Kuzyk, "Fundamental Limits of Nonlinear Susceptibilities," Optics and Photonic News, December, page 26 (2003). (Special issue "Optics in 2003") summarizes 29 of "the most exciting research to emerge in the last 12 months "of cutting edge research."
- Kakoli Tripathy, Javier Perez Moreno, Mark G. Kuzyk, Benjamin J. Coe, Koen Clays, and Anne Myers Kelley, "Why Hyperpolarizabilities Fall Short of the Fundamental Quantum Limits," J. Chem. Phys. 121, 7932 (2004).
- Washington State University news service article Whoosh! Goes the Internet: International Research Team Blazes the Optical Trail with Record-Setting Molecules published January 2, 2007
- National Geographic
- MIT News
- IEEE Canada Newsletter
- Laser Focus World
- The Ottawa Citizen
- SCI-TECH News
