= Molecular surface =

Molecular surface may refer to one of the following.

- The Van der Waals surface
- Accessible surface area or Connolly surface
- Any of isosurfaces for a molecule
