= Anapole =

System of currents that do not radiate into the far field

In physics, an anapole (from Greek ἀνά (ana) 'above' and πόλος (polos) 'pole') is a system of currents that does not radiate into the far field. The term "anapole" first appeared in the work of Zel'dovich, in which he thanks A. S. Kompaneets, who first proposed the name.

An anapole is a system of currents that transforms under all transformations of the symmetry group O(3) as a certain multipole (or the corresponding vector spherical harmonic), but does not radiate to the far field.

== Photonics ==
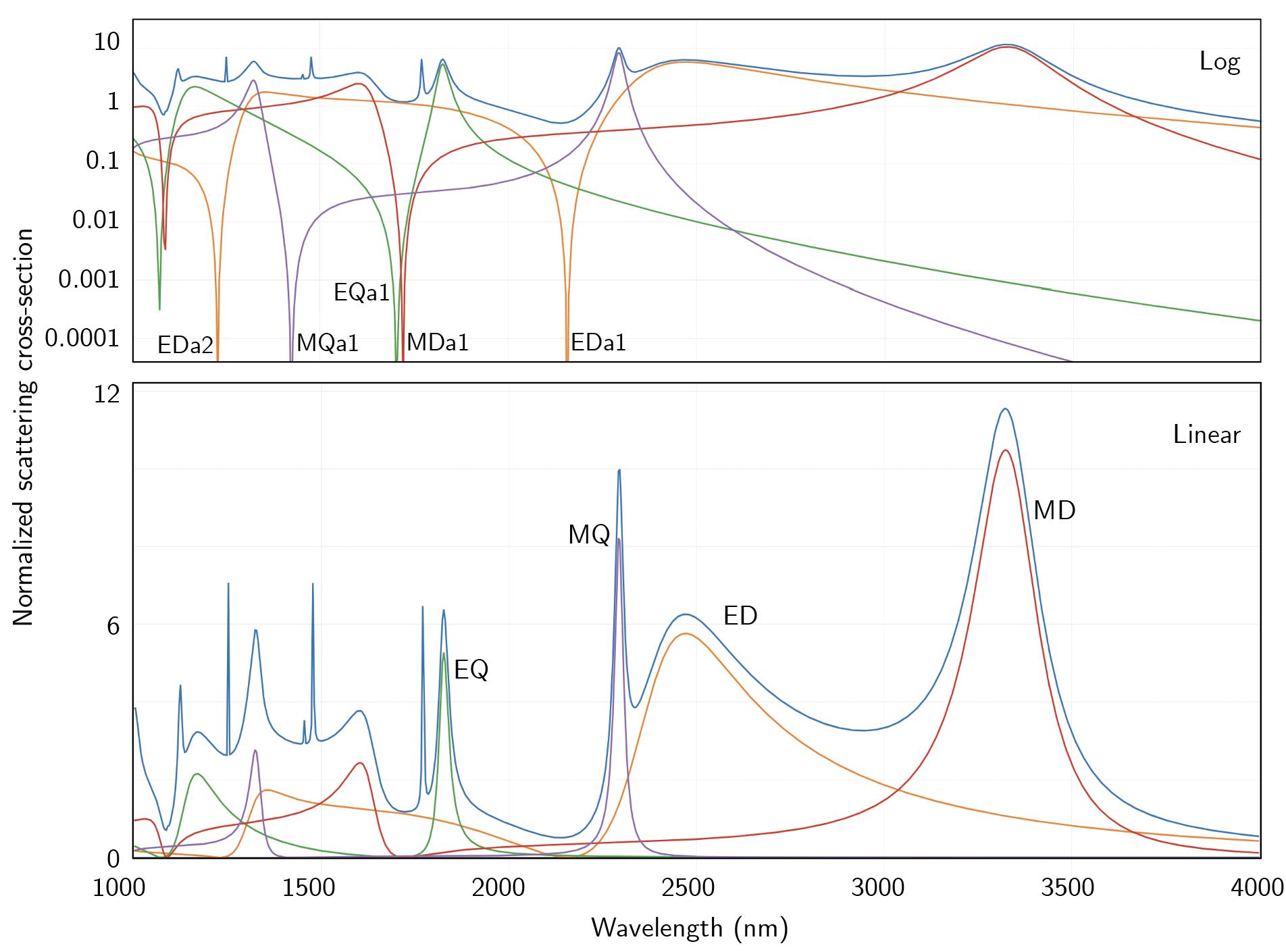
Mie scattering by a dielectric nanoparticle with refractive index n=4.5. Normalized scattering cross-section spectrum in linear and log scale. Zeros, which refer to anapole states, are marked.

In photonics, anapoles first appeared in 2015 as zeros in the Mie-coefficient of a particular multipole in the scattering spectrum. They can also be explained as destructive interference of a "cartesian multipole" and a "toroidal multipole". The anapole state is not an eigenmode. Total scattering cross-section is not zero in the anapole state, due to the contribution of other multipoles.

The terms "anapole" and toroidal moment were once used synonymously, but this is no longer common.

== See also ==
- Toroidal moment
