= Intrinsic hyperpolarizability =

Intrinsic hyperpolarizability in physics, mathematics and statistics, is a scale invariant quantity that can be used to compare molecules of different sizes. The intrinsic hyperpolarizability is defined as the hyperpolarizability divided by the Kuzyk Limit. This quantity is scale invariant and thus is independent of the energy scale and number of electrons in a molecule that is being evaluated for its nonlinear optical response. Therefore, it can be used to compare molecules of different shapes and sizes.

The Intrinsic Hyperpolarizability can be used as a figure of merit for comparing molecules for their usefulness in electro-optics applications.

== See also ==
- Molecular mechanics
- Molecular modelling
- Quantum chemistry
