= Toroidal moment =

Type of electromagnetic dipole

In electromagnetism, a toroidal moment is an independent term in the multipole expansion of the electromagnetic field which is distinct from magnetic and electric multipoles. In the electrostatic multipole expansion, all charge and current distributions can be expanded into a complete set of electric and magnetic multipole coefficients. However, additional terms arise in an electrodynamic multipole expansion. The coefficients of these terms are given by the toroidal multipole moments as well as time derivatives of the electric and magnetic multipole moments. While electric dipoles can be understood as separated charges and magnetic dipoles as circular currents, axial (or electric) toroidal dipoles describe toroidal (donut-shaped) charge arrangements whereas a polar (or magnetic) toroidal dipole (also called an anapole) corresponds to the field of a solenoid bent into a torus.

== Classical toroidal dipole moment ==
A complex expression allows the current density J to be written as a sum of electric, magnetic, and toroidal moments using Cartesian or spherical differential operators. The lowest order toroidal term is the toroidal dipole. Its magnitude along direction i is given by

$$T_i=\frac{1}{10c} \int [r_i(\mathbf{r}\cdot\mathbf{J})-2r^2J_i] \mathrm{d}^3x.$$

Since this term arises only in an expansion of the current density to second order, it generally vanishes in a long-wavelength approximation.

However, a recent study comes to the result that the toroidal multipole moments are not a separate multipole family, but rather higher order terms of the electric multipole moments.

== Quantum toroidal dipole moment ==
In 1957, Yakov Zel'dovich found that because the weak interaction violates parity symmetry, a spin-1/2 Dirac particle must have a toroidal dipole moment, also known as an anapole moment, in addition to the usual electric and magnetic dipoles. The interaction of this term is most easily understood in the non-relativistic limit, where the Hamiltonian is
$$\mathcal{H} \propto - d (\mathbf{\sigma} \cdot \mathbf{E}) - \mu(\mathbf{\sigma} \cdot \mathbf{B}) - a(\mathbf{\sigma} \cdot \nabla \times \mathbf{B}) ,$$
where d, μ, and a are the electric, magnetic, and anapole moments, respectively, and σ is the vector of Pauli matrices.

The nuclear toroidal moment of cesium was measured in 1997 by Wood et al..

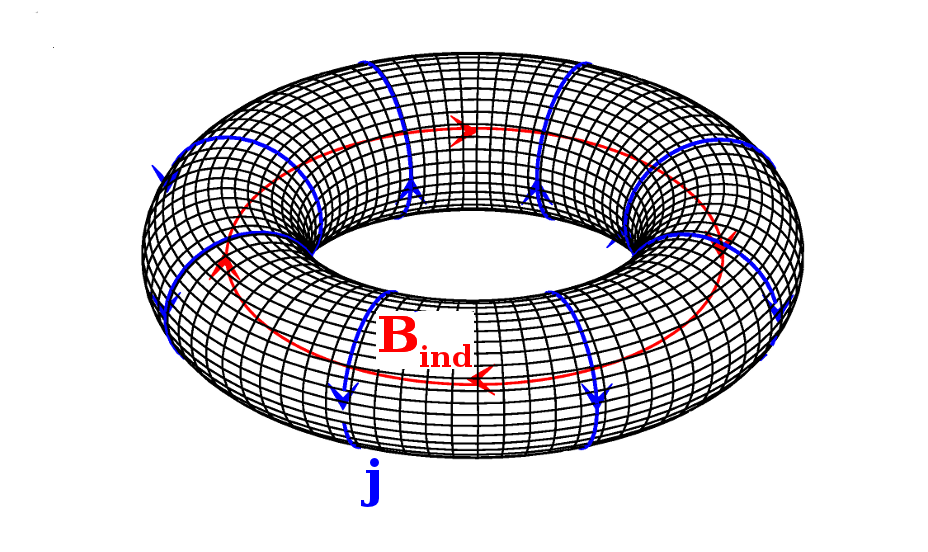
Solenoid currents j (blue) inducing a toroidal magnetic moment (red).

== Symmetry properties of dipole moments ==
All dipole moments are vectors which can be distinguished by their differing symmetries under spatial inversion (P : r ↦ −r) and time reversal (T : t ↦ −t). Either the dipole moment stays invariant under the symmetry transformation ("+1") or it changes its direction ("−1"):

Dipole moment	P	T
axial toroidal dipole moment	+1	+1
electric dipole moment	−1	+1
magnetic dipole moment	+1	−1
polar toroidal dipole moment	−1	−1

== Magnetic toroidal moments in condensed matter physics ==
In condensed matter magnetic toroidal order can be induced by different mechanisms:

- Order of localized spins breaking spatial inversion and time reversal. The resulting toroidal moment is described by a sum of cross products of the spins S_{i} of the magnetic ions and their positions r_{i} within the magnetic unit cell: T = Σ_{i} r_{i} × S_{i}
- Formation of vortices by delocalized magnetic moments.
- On-site orbital currents (as found in multiferroic CuO).
- Orbital loop currents have been proposed in copper oxides superconductors that might be important to understand high-temperature superconductivity. Experimental verification of symmetry-breaking by such orbital currents has been claimed in cuprates through polarized neutron-scattering.

== Magnetic toroidal moment and its relation to the magnetoelectric effect ==
The presence of a magnetic toroidic dipole moment T in condensed matter is due to the presence of a magnetoelectric effect: Application of a magnetic field H in the plane of a toroidal solenoid leads via the Lorentz force to an accumulation of current loops and thus to an electric polarization perpendicular to both T and H. The resulting polarization has the form P_{i} = ε_{ijk}T_{j}H_{k} (with ε being the Levi-Civita symbol). The resulting magnetoelectric tensor describing the cross-correlated response is thus antisymmetric.

== Ferrotoroidicity in condensed matter physics ==
A phase transition to spontaneous long-range order of microscopic magnetic toroidal moments has been termed ferrotoroidicity. It is expected to fill the symmetry schemes of primary ferroics (phase transitions with spontaneous point symmetry breaking) with a space-odd, time-odd macroscopic order parameter. A ferrotoroidic material would exhibit domains which could be switched by an appropriate field, e.g. a magnetic field curl. Both of these hallmark properties of a ferroic state have been demonstrated in an artificial ferrotoroidic model system based on a nanomagnetic array.

The existence of ferrotoroidicity is still under debate and clear-cut evidence has not been presented yet—mostly due to the difficulty to distinguish ferrotoroidicity from antiferromagnetic order, as both have no net magnetization and the order parameter symmetry is the same.

== Anapole dark matter ==
All CPT self-conjugate particles, in particular the Majorana fermion, are forbidden from having any multipole moments other than toroidal moments. At tree level (i.e. without allowing loops in Feynman diagrams) an anapole-only particle interacts only with external currents, not with free-space electromagnetic fields, and the interaction cross-section diminishes as the particle velocity slows. For this reason, heavy Majorana fermions have been suggested as plausible candidates for cold dark matter.

== See also ==
- Spheromak
- Dynamic toroidal dipole
- Anapole

== Literature ==
- Stefan Nanz: Toroidal Multipole Moments in Classical Electrodynamics. Springer 2016. ISBN 978-3-658-12548-6
