= Polarizability =

Tendency of matter subjected to an electric field to acquire an electric dipole moment

Polarizability usually refers to the tendency of matter, when subjected to an electric field, to acquire an electric dipole moment in proportion to that applied field. It is a property of particles with an electric charge. When subject to an electric field, the negatively charged electrons and positively charged atomic nuclei are subject to opposite forces and undergo charge separation. Polarizability is responsible for a material's dielectric constant and, at high (optical) frequencies, its refractive index.

The polarizability of an atom or molecule is defined as the ratio of its induced dipole moment to the local electric field; in a crystalline solid, one considers the dipole moment per unit cell. Note that the local electric field seen by a molecule is generally different from the macroscopic electric field that would be measured externally. This discrepancy is taken into account by the Clausius–Mossotti relation (below) which connects the bulk behaviour (polarization density due to an external electric field according to the electric susceptibility $\chi = \varepsilon_{\mathrm r}-1$) with the molecular polarizability $\alpha$ due to the local field.

Magnetic polarizability likewise refers to the tendency for a magnetic dipole moment to appear in proportion to an external magnetic field. Electric and magnetic polarizabilities determine the dynamical response of a bound system (such as a molecule or crystal) to external fields, and provide insight into a molecule's internal structure. "Polarizability" should not be confused with the intrinsic magnetic or electric dipole moment of an atom, molecule, or bulk substance; these do not depend on the presence of an external field.

== Electric polarizability ==
=== Definition ===
Electric polarizability is the relative tendency of a charge distribution, like the electron cloud of an atom or molecule, to be distorted from its normal shape by an external electric field.

The polarizability $\alpha$ in isotropic media is defined as the ratio of the induced dipole moment $\mathbf{p}$ of an atom to the electric field $\mathbf{E}$ that produces this dipole moment.

$$\alpha = \frac{\left|\mathbf{p}\right|}{\left|\mathbf{E}\right|}$$

Polarizability has the SI units of C·m^{2}·V^{−1} = A^{2}·s^{4}·kg^{−1} while its cgs unit is cm^{3}. Usually it is expressed in cgs units as a so-called polarizability volume, sometimes expressed in Å^{3} = 10^{−24} cm^{3}. One can convert from SI units ($\alpha$) to cgs units ($\alpha'$) as follows:

$$\alpha' (\mathrm{cm}^3) =  \frac{10^{6}}{ 4 \pi \varepsilon_0 }\alpha (\mathrm{C{\cdot}m^2{\cdot}V^{-1}}) = \frac{10^{6}}{ 4 \pi \varepsilon_0 }\alpha (\mathrm{F{\cdot}m^2}) \approx 8.988{\times}{10}^{15} \times \alpha  (\mathrm{F{\cdot}m^2})$$

where $\varepsilon_0$, the vacuum permittivity, is ≈8.854 × 10^{−12} (F/m). If the polarizability volume in cgs units is denoted $\alpha'$ the relation can be expressed generally (in SI) as $\alpha = 4\pi\varepsilon_0 \alpha'$.

The polarizability of individual particles is related to the average electric susceptibility of the medium by the Clausius–Mossotti relation:
$$R = \frac {4\pi}{3} N_\text{A}\alpha_{c} = \frac {M}{p} \left(\frac {\varepsilon_\mathrm{r} - 1}{\varepsilon_\mathrm{r} + 2}\right)$$
where R is the molar refractivity, $N_\text{A}$ is the Avogadro constant, $\alpha_c$ is the electronic polarizability, p is the density of molecules, M is the molar mass, and $\varepsilon_{\mathrm r} = \epsilon/\epsilon_0$ is the material's relative permittivity or dielectric constant (or in optics, the square of the refractive index).

Polarizability for anisotropic or non-spherical media cannot in general be represented as a scalar quantity. Defining $\alpha$ as a scalar implies both that applied electric fields can only induce polarization components parallel to the field and that the $x, y$ and $z$ directions respond in the same way to the applied electric field. For example, an electric field in the $x$-direction can only produce an $x$ component in $\mathbf{p}$ and if that same electric field were applied in the $y$-direction the induced polarization would be the same in magnitude but appear in the $y$ component of $\mathbf{p}$. Many crystalline materials have directions that are easier to polarize than others and some even become polarized in directions perpendicular to the applied electric field, and the same thing happens with non-spherical bodies. Some molecules and materials with this sort of anisotropy are optically active, or exhibit linear birefringence of light.

=== Tensor ===
To describe anisotropic media a polarizability rank two tensor or 3×3 matrix $\alpha$ is defined,

$$\mathbb{\alpha} =
\begin{bmatrix}
\alpha_{xx} & \alpha_{xy} & \alpha_{xz} \\
\alpha_{yx} & \alpha_{yy} & \alpha_{yz} \\
\alpha_{zx} & \alpha_{zy} & \alpha_{zz} \\
\end{bmatrix}$$

so that:

$$\mathbf{p} = \mathbb{\alpha} \mathbf{E}$$

The elements describing the response parallel to the applied electric field are those along the diagonal. A large value of $\alpha_{yx}$ here means that an electric-field applied in the $x$-direction would strongly polarize the material in the $y$-direction. Explicit expressions for $\alpha$ have been given for homogeneous anisotropic ellipsoidal bodies.

=== Application in crystallography ===
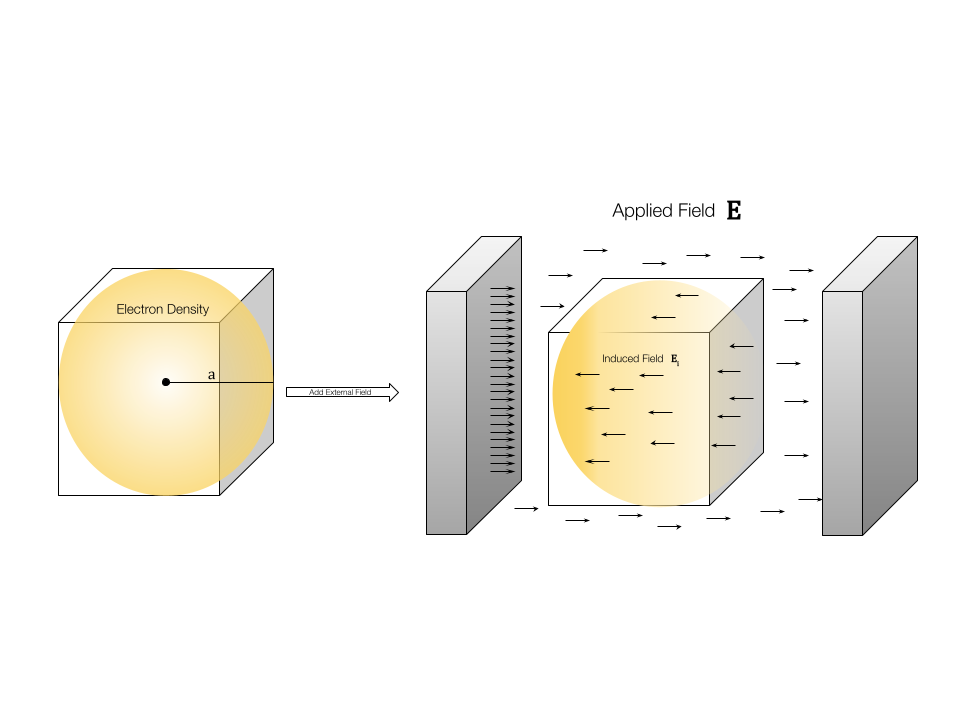
Macroscopic Field Applied to a Cubic Crystal

The matrix above can be used with the molar refractivity equation and other data to produce density data for crystallography. Each polarizability measurement along with the refractive index associated with its direction will yield a direction specific density that can be used to develop an accurate three dimensional assessment of molecular stacking in the crystal. This relationship was first observed by Linus Pauling.

Polarizability and molecular property are related to refractive index and bulk property. In crystalline structures, the interactions between molecules are considered by comparing a local field to the macroscopic field. Analyzing a cubic crystal lattice, we can imagine an isotropic spherical region to represent the entire sample. Giving the region the radius $a$, the field would be given by the volume of the sphere times the dipole moment per unit volume $\mathbf{P}.$

$$\mathbf{p} = \frac{4 \pi a^3}{3} \mathbf{P}.$$

We can call our local field $\mathbf{F}$, our macroscopic field $\mathbf{E}$, and the field due to matter within the sphere, $\mathbf E_{\mathrm{in}} = -\tfrac{\mathbf{P}}{3 \varepsilon_0}$ We can then define the local field as the macroscopic field without the contribution of the internal field:

$$\mathbf{F}=\mathbf{E}-\mathbf{E}_{\mathrm{in}}=\mathbf{E}+\frac{\mathbf{P}}{3 \varepsilon_0}$$

The polarization is proportional to the macroscopic field by $\mathbf{P}= \varepsilon_0 (\varepsilon_r-1) \mathbf{E} = \chi_{\text{e}}\varepsilon_0\mathbf{E}$ where $\varepsilon_0$ is the electric permittivity constant and $\chi_{\text{e}}$ is the electric susceptibility. Using this proportionality, we find the local field as $\mathbf{F}=\tfrac{1}{3}(\varepsilon_{\mathrm r}+2)\mathbf{E}$ which can be used in the definition of polarization

$$\mathbf{P}=\frac{N\alpha}{V}\mathbf{F}=\frac{N\alpha}{3V}(\varepsilon_{\mathrm r}+2)\mathbf{E}$$

and simplified with $\varepsilon_{\mathrm r}=1+\tfrac{N\alpha}{\varepsilon_0V}$ to get $\mathbf{P}=\varepsilon_0(\varepsilon_{\mathrm r}-1)\mathbf{E}$. These two terms can both be set equal to the other, eliminating the $\mathbf{E}$ term giving us
$$\frac{\varepsilon_{\mathrm r}-1}{\varepsilon_{\mathrm r}+2}=\frac{N\alpha}{3\varepsilon_0V}.$$

We can replace the relative permittivity $\varepsilon_{\mathrm r}$ with refractive index $n$, since $\varepsilon_{\mathrm r}=n^2$ for a low-pressure gas. The number density can be related to the molecular weight $M$ and mass density $\rho$ through $\tfrac{N}{V}=\tfrac{N_{\mathrm A}\rho}{M}$, adjusting the final form of our equation to include molar refractivity:

$$R_{\mathrm M} = \frac{N_{\mathrm A}\alpha}{3\varepsilon_0} = \left(\frac{M}{\rho}\right) \frac{n^2-1}{n^2+2}$$

This equation allows us to relate bulk property (refractive index) to the molecular property (polarizability) as a function of frequency.

== Atomic and molecular polarizability ==
Generally, polarizability increases as the volume occupied by electrons increases. In atoms, this occurs because larger atoms have more loosely held electrons in contrast to smaller atoms with tightly bound electrons. On rows of the periodic table, polarizability therefore decreases from left to right. Polarizability increases down on columns of the periodic table. Likewise, larger molecules are generally more polarizable than smaller ones.

Water is a very polar molecule, but alkanes and other hydrophobic molecules are more polarizable. Water with its permanent dipole is less likely to change shape due to an external electric field. Alkanes are the most polarizable molecules. Although alkenes and arenes are expected to have larger polarizability than alkanes because of their higher reactivity compared to alkanes, alkanes are in fact more polarizable. This results because of alkene's and arene's more electronegative sp^{2} carbons to the alkane's less electronegative sp^{3} carbons.

Ground state electron configuration models often describe molecular or bond polarization during chemical reactions poorly, because reactive intermediates may be excited, or be the minor, alternate structures in a chemical equilibrium with the initial reactant.

== Magnetic polarizability ==
Magnetic polarizability defined by spin interactions of nucleons is an important parameter of deuterons and hadrons. In particular, measurement of tensor polarizabilities of nucleons yields important information about spin-dependent nuclear forces.

The method of spin amplitudes uses quantum mechanics formalism to more easily describe spin dynamics. Vector and tensor polarization of particle/nuclei with spin S ≥ 1 are specified by the unit polarization vector $\mathbf{p}$ and the polarization tensor P_{`}. Additional tensors composed of products of three or more spin matrices are needed only for the exhaustive description of polarization of particles/nuclei with spin S ≥ 3/2.

== See also ==
- Dielectric
- Electric susceptibility
- Hyperpolarizability
- Polarization density
- MOSCED, an estimation method for activity coefficients which uses polarizability as one of its parameters
