= Mark G. Kuzyk =

American physicist

Mark George Kuzyk
- Born: May 7, 1958 (age 68); Chester, Pennsylvania
- Education: University of Pennsylvania
- Awards: Fellow of the Optical Society of America; Fellow of SPIE; Fellow of the American Physics Society; Regents Professor; Distinguished Faculty Address
- Scientific career
- Fields: Physicist
- Workplaces: University of Pennsylvania; Bell Laboratories; Washington State University
- Thesis: Third order nonlinear optical processes in organic systems (1985)
- Doctoral advisor: Anthony F. Garito

Mark G. Kuzyk (born May 7, 1958 in Chester, Pennsylvania) is an American physicist. He received his Ph.D. degree at the University of Pennsylvania in 1985, then was a member of technical staff at Bell Labs in Princeton, New Jersey from 1985 to 1990. He has been a professor of physics and astronomy at Washington State University since 1990, where he has served as associate chair of Physics, Chair of the Materials Science Program, and Chair of Graduate Studies in Physics.

He is best known for his quantum calculations of the fundamental limits of the nonlinear-optical response and the observation of what is now called the Kuzyk quantum gap. Other significant work includes the first demonstration of single-mode polymer optical fiber and the demonstration of Photomechanical Effects in dye-doped polymers.

More recent work includes studies of novel molecules that when doped into polymers recover from photodegradation when left in the dark. Since these same molecules, when dissolved in liquid solution, degrade irreversibly, this work offers a unique glimpse into the meaning of irreversibility and how one might be able to control The Arrow of Time.

Kuzyk's honors include the Boeing Distinguished Professorship and presentation of the Washington State University 2005 Distinguished Faculty Address. In 2009, he was named regents professor, the distinguished professor designation at Washington State University. He was elected to fellowship in the Optical Society of America in 1999 and is author of the book, Polymer Fiber Optics.

== Background ==
Kuzyk is the son of Walter Roman Kuzyk (a mechanical engineer) and Irene Bernakiewicz (a pharmacist), who emigrated from Ukraine after World War II. He went to Stetser Elementary School in Chester, Pennsylvania from 1963 to 1968, Nether Providence Elementary School from 1968 to 1970, Nether Providence Middle School from 1970 to 1972, and Nether Providence High School from 1972 to 1976. While in high school, he excelled in Math and Science, taking college classes at Widener college. Kuzyk won the award for outstanding achievement in mathematics in 1976.
