= Roman Kuzyk =

Ukrainian footballer

Personal information
- Full name: Roman Kuzyk
- Date of birth: 7 June 1989 (age 37)
- Place of birth: Ukraine
- Height: 1.81 m (5 ft 11 in)
- Position: Defender

Senior career*
Years	Team	Apps	(Gls)
2006–2009	FC Karpaty Lviv	0	(0)
2006–2009	→ FC Karpaty-2 Lviv	47	(2)
- * Club domestic league appearances and goals

Roman Kuzyk (born 7 June 1989 in Ukraine) is a professional Ukrainian football defender.

== Career ==
He played for Ukrainian Premier League club FC Karpaty Lviv. He is the product of the FC Karpaty Lviv youth team school system.
