= Dynamic toroidal dipole =

In classical electrodynamics, the dynamic toroidal dipole arises from time-dependent currents flowing along the poloidal direction on the surface of a torus. In relativistic quantum mechanics, spin contributions to the toroidal dipole needs to be taken into account. Toroidal dipole moments are odd under parity and time-reversal symmetries. Dynamic toroidal dipole is distinguished from the static toroidal dipole introduced by Zeldovich in 1957 under the name of static anapole.

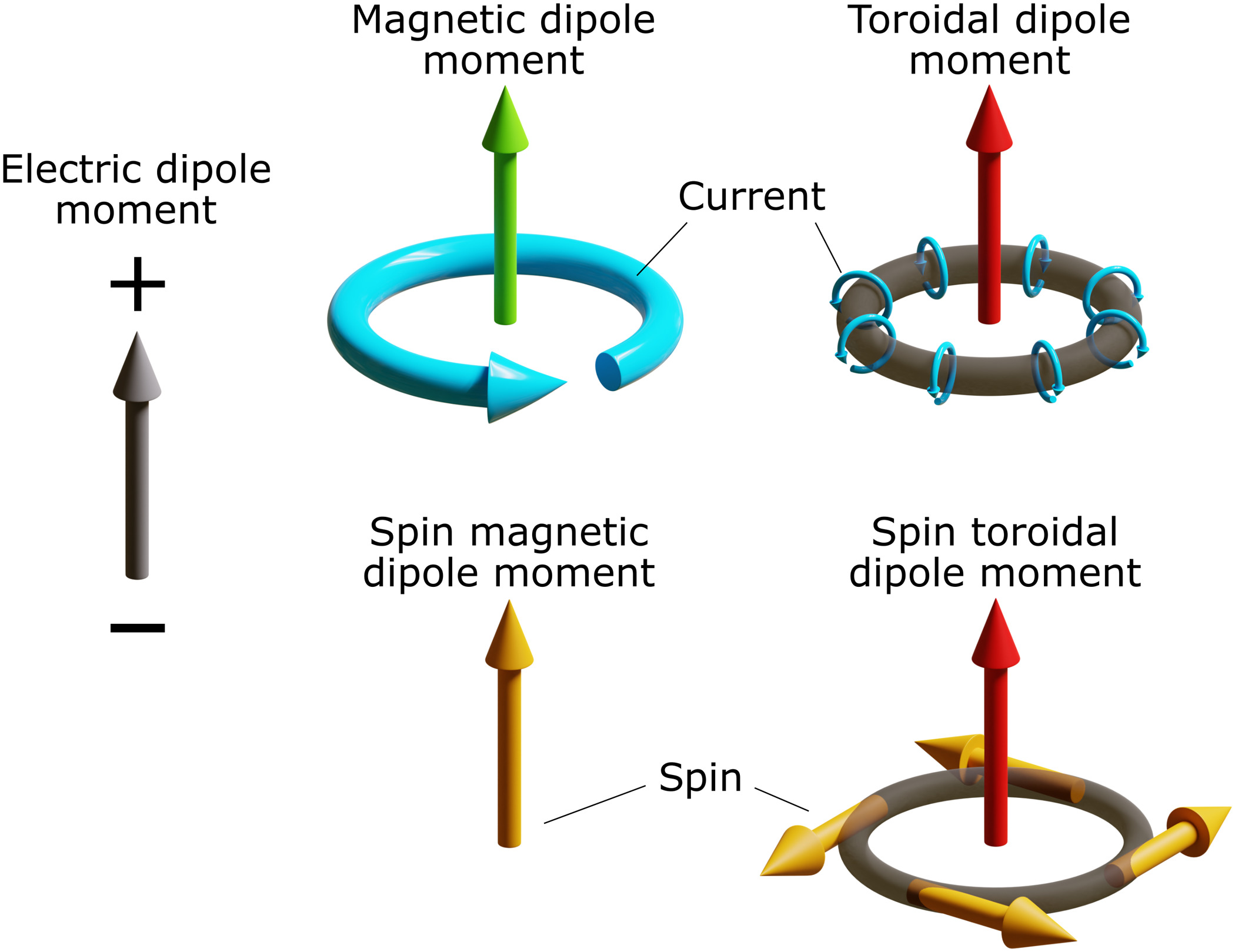
Schematic illustrations of static electric, magnetic, and toroidal dipoles in classical electrodynamics. In relativistic quantum physics, apart from magnetic and toroidal moments induced by charge currents, spin must be considered because it can also contribute to the toroidal dipole moment. Image created by Diego P. Araujo (Biosteam)

The dynamic toroidal multipoles were theoretically introduced in the 1970s in the context of a complete multipole expansion in electrodynamics and their radiation properties were studied in a series of theoretical works. The experimental study of dynamic toroidal multipoles, however, became possible only with advances in artificial electromagnetic materials (metamaterials), leading to the first experimental observation of the toroidal dipole, in 2010 in an array of microwave resonators with elements of toroidal symmetry.

The far-field radiation properties of the dynamic toroidal dipole are identical to those of the conventional electric dipole. Hence combining a dynamic toroidal dipole with an electric dipole can result in a non-radiating charge-current configuration (termed dynamic anapole), in which the electromagnetic fields vanish outside the source, whereas the vector potential persists. Non-radiating anapoles were observed experimentally for the first time in 2013 as peak of transmission of structured matter at microwave frequencies and in 2015 at optical wavelengths in nanoparticles. Electrodynamics of dynamic toroidal dipole and anapoles is now massively influencing research in metamaterials, nanoparticles, plasmonics, sensors, lasers and spectroscopy

Note: The terminology of dynamic "electric" and "magnetic" toroidal multipoles has also been introduced. The latter is already part of the standard multipole expansion in the form of the mean square radii of the magnetic multipoles.

== See also ==
- Multipole expansion
- Toroidal moment
