= Permittivity =

Measure of the electric polarizability of a dielectric material

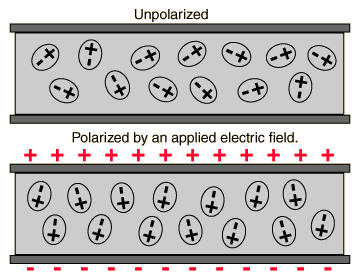
A dielectric medium showing orientation of charged particles creating polarization effects. Such a medium can have a lower ratio of electric flux to charge (more permittivity) than empty space.

In electromagnetism, the absolute permittivity, often simply called permittivity and denoted by the Greek letter ε (epsilon), is a measure of the electric polarizability of a dielectric material. A material with high permittivity polarizes more in response to an applied electric field than a material with low permittivity, thereby storing more energy in the material. In electrostatics, the permittivity plays an important role in determining the capacitance of a capacitor.

In the simplest case, the electric displacement field D resulting from an applied electric field E is

$$\mathbf{D} = \varepsilon\ \mathbf{E} ~.$$

More generally, the permittivity is a thermodynamic function of state. It can depend on the frequency, magnitude, and direction of the applied field. The SI unit for permittivity is farad per meter (F/m).

The permittivity is often represented by the relative permittivity ε_{r} which is the ratio of the absolute permittivity ε and the vacuum permittivity ε_{0}

$$\kappa = \varepsilon_\mathrm{r} = \frac{\varepsilon}{\varepsilon_0} ~.$$

This dimensionless quantity is also often and ambiguously referred to as the permittivity. Another common term encountered for both absolute and relative permittivity is the dielectric constant which has been deprecated in physics and engineering as well as in chemistry.

By definition, a perfect vacuum has a relative permittivity of exactly 1 whereas at standard temperature and pressure, air has a relative permittivity of ε_{r air} ≡ κ_{air} ≈ 1.0006 .

Relative permittivity is directly related to electric susceptibility (χ) by

$$\chi = \kappa - 1$$

otherwise written as

$$\varepsilon = \varepsilon_\mathrm{r}\ \varepsilon_0 = ( 1 + \chi )\ \varepsilon_0 ~.$$

The term "permittivity" was introduced in the 1880s by Oliver Heaviside to complement Thomson's (1872) "permeability". Formerly written as p, the designation with ε has been in common use since the 1950s.

== Units ==
The SI unit of permittivity is farad per meter (F/m or F·m^{−1}).

$$\frac{\text{F}}{\text{m}} = \frac{\text{C}}{\text{V} {\cdot} \text{m}} = \frac{\text{C}^2}{\text{N} {\cdot} \text{m}^2} = \frac{\text{C}^2 {\cdot} \text{s}^2}{\text{kg} {\cdot} \text{m}^3}= \frac{\text{A}^2 {\cdot} \text{s}^4}{\text{kg} {\cdot} \text{m}^3}$$

== Explanation ==
In electromagnetism, the electric displacement field D represents the distribution of electric charges in a given medium resulting from the presence of an electric field E. This distribution includes charge migration and electric dipole reorientation. Its relation to permittivity in the very simple case of linear, homogeneous, isotropic materials with "instantaneous" response to changes in electric field is:

$$\mathbf{D} = \varepsilon\ \mathbf{E}$$

where the permittivity ε is a scalar. If the medium is anisotropic, the permittivity is a second rank tensor.

In general, permittivity is not a constant, as it can vary with the position in the medium, the frequency of the field applied, humidity, temperature, and other parameters. In a nonlinear medium, the permittivity can depend on the strength of the electric field. Permittivity as a function of frequency can take on real or complex values.

In SI units, permittivity is measured in farads per meter (F/m or A^{2}·s^{4}·kg^{−1}·m^{−3}). The displacement field D is measured in units of coulombs per square meter (C/m^{2}), while the electric field E is measured in volts per meter (V/m). D and E describe the interaction between charged objects. D is related to the charge densities associated with this interaction, while E is related to the forces and potential differences.

== Vacuum permittivity ==
The vacuum permittivity ε_{0} (also called permittivity of free space or the electric constant) is the ratio D/E in free space. It also appears in the Coulomb force constant,

$$k_\text{e} = \frac{1}{\ 4\pi \varepsilon_0\ }$$

Its value is

$$\varepsilon_0 \ \stackrel{\mathrm{def}}{=}\  \frac{1}{c^2\mu_0}  \approx 8.854\,187\,8128(13)\times 10^{-12}\text{ F/m }$$

where

- c is the speed of light in free space,
- µ_{0} is the vacuum permeability.

The constants c and µ_{0} were both defined in SI units to have exact numerical values until the 2019 revision of the SI. Therefore, until that date, ε_{0} could be also stated exactly as a fraction, $\ \tfrac{1}{c^2\mu_0} = \tfrac{1}{35\,950\,207\,149.472\,7056\pi}\text{ F/m}\$ even if the result was irrational (because the fraction contained π). In contrast, the ampere was a measured quantity before 2019, but since then the ampere is now exactly defined and it is μ_{0} that is an experimentally measured quantity (with consequent uncertainty) and therefore so is the new 2019 definition of ε_{0} (c remains exactly defined before and since 2019).

== Relative permittivity ==
The linear permittivity of a homogeneous material is usually given relative to that of free space, as a relative permittivity ε_{r} (also called dielectric constant, although this term is deprecated and sometimes only refers to the static, zero-frequency relative permittivity). In an anisotropic material, the relative permittivity may be a tensor, causing birefringence. The actual permittivity is then calculated by multiplying the relative permittivity by ε_{o}:

$$\ \varepsilon = \varepsilon_\mathrm{r}\ \varepsilon_0 = (1 + \chi)\ \varepsilon_0\ ,$$

where χ (frequently written χ_{e}) is the electric susceptibility of the material.

The susceptibility is defined as the constant of proportionality (which may be a tensor) relating an electric field E to the induced dielectric polarization density P such that

$$\ \mathbf{P}\ =\ \varepsilon_0\ \chi\ \mathbf{E}\; ,$$

where ε_{o} is the electric permittivity of free space.

The susceptibility of a medium is related to its relative permittivity ε_{r} by

$$\chi = \varepsilon_\mathrm{r} - 1 ~.$$

So in the case of a vacuum,

$$\chi =  0 ~.$$

The susceptibility is also related to the polarizability of individual particles in the medium by the Clausius-Mossotti relation.

The electric displacement D is related to the polarization density P by

$$\mathbf{D} = \varepsilon_0\ \mathbf{E} + \mathbf{P} = \varepsilon_0\ (1+\chi)\ \mathbf{E} = \varepsilon_\mathrm{r}\ \varepsilon_0\ \mathbf{E} ~.$$

The permittivity ε and permeability µ of a medium together determine the phase velocity v = c/n of electromagnetic radiation through that medium:

$$\varepsilon \mu = \frac{ 1 }{\ v^2 } ~.$$

== Practical applications ==
=== Determining capacitance ===
The capacitance of a capacitor is based on its design and architecture, meaning it will not change with charging and discharging. The formula for capacitance in a parallel plate capacitor is written as

$$C = \varepsilon \ \frac{A}{d}$$

where $A$ is the area of one plate, $d$ is the distance between the plates, and $\varepsilon$ is the permittivity of the medium between the two plates. For a capacitor with relative permittivity $\kappa$, it can be said that

$$C = \kappa \ \varepsilon_0 \frac{A}{d}$$

=== Gauss's law ===
Permittivity is connected to electric flux (and by extension electric field) through Gauss's law. Gauss's law states that for a closed Gaussian surface, S,

$$\Phi_E = \frac{Q_\text{enc}}{\varepsilon_0} = \oint_S \mathbf{E} \cdot \mathrm{d} \mathbf{A}\ ,$$
where $\Phi_E$ is the net electric flux passing through the surface, $Q_\text{enc}$ is the charge enclosed in the Gaussian surface, $\mathbf{E}$ is the electric field vector at a given point on the surface, and $\mathrm{d} \mathbf{A}$ is a differential area vector on the Gaussian surface.

If the Gaussian surface uniformly encloses an insulated, symmetrical charge arrangement, the formula can be simplified to

$$E\ A\ \cos \theta = \frac{\; Q_\text{enc} }{\ \varepsilon_0\ }\ ,$$
where $\ \theta\$ represents the angle between the electric field lines and the normal (perpendicular) to S.

If all of the electric field lines cross the surface at 90°, the formula can be further simplified to

$$\ E = \frac{\; Q_\text{enc} }{\ \varepsilon_0\ A\ } ~.$$

Because the surface area of a sphere is $\ 4 \pi r^2\ ,$ the electric field a distance $r$ away from a uniform, spherical charge arrangement is

$$\ E = \frac{ Q }{\ \varepsilon_0 A\ } = \frac{ Q }{\ \varepsilon_0\ \left(4\ \pi\ r^2\right)\ } = \frac{ Q }{\ 4 \pi\ \varepsilon_0\ r^2\ } ~.$$

This formula applies to the electric field due to a point charge, outside of a conducting sphere or shell, outside of a uniformly charged insulating sphere, or between the plates of a spherical capacitor.

== Dispersion and causality ==
In general, a material cannot polarize instantaneously in response to an applied field, and so the more general formulation as a function of time is

$$\mathbf{P}(t) = \varepsilon_0 \int_{-\infty}^t \chi\left(t - t'\right) \mathbf{E}\left(t'\right) \, \mathrm{d}t' ~.$$

That is, the polarization is a convolution of the electric field at previous times with time-dependent susceptibility given by χ(Δt). The upper limit of this integral can be extended to infinity as well if one defines χ(Δt) = 0 for Δt < 0. An instantaneous response would correspond to a Dirac delta function susceptibility χ(Δt) = χδ(Δt).

It is convenient to take the Fourier transform with respect to time and write this relationship as a function of frequency. Because of the convolution theorem, the integral becomes a simple product,

$$\ \mathbf{P}(\omega) = \varepsilon_0\ \chi(\omega)\ \mathbf{E}(\omega) ~.$$

This frequency dependence of the susceptibility leads to frequency dependence of the permittivity. The shape of the susceptibility with respect to frequency characterizes the dispersion properties of the material.

Moreover, the fact that the polarization can only depend on the electric field at previous times (i.e. effectively χ(Δt) = 0 for Δt < 0), a consequence of causality, imposes Kramers–Kronig constraints on the susceptibility χ(0).

=== Complex permittivity ===
A dielectric permittivity spectrum over a wide range of frequencies. ε′ and ε″ denote the real and the imaginary part of the permittivity, respectively. Various processes are labeled on the image: ionic and dipolar relaxation, and atomic and electronic resonances at higher energies.

As opposed to the response of a vacuum, the response of normal materials to external fields generally depends on the frequency of the field. This frequency dependence reflects the fact that a material's polarization does not change instantaneously when an electric field is applied. The response must always be causal (arising after the applied field), which can be represented by a phase difference. For this reason, permittivity is often treated as a complex function of the (angular) frequency ω of the applied field:

$$\varepsilon \rightarrow \hat{\varepsilon}(\omega)$$

(since complex numbers allow specification of magnitude and phase). The definition of permittivity therefore becomes

$$D_0\ e^{-i \omega t} = \hat{\varepsilon}(\omega)\ E_0\ e^{-i \omega t}\ ,$$
where

- D_{o} and E_{o} are the amplitudes of the displacement and electric fields, respectively,
- i is the imaginary unit, i^{2} = − 1 .

The response of a medium to static electric fields is described by the low-frequency limit of permittivity, also called the static permittivity ε_{s} (also ε_{DC}):

$$\varepsilon_\mathrm{s} = \lim_{\omega \rightarrow 0} \hat{\varepsilon}(\omega) ~.$$

At the high-frequency limit (meaning optical frequencies), the complex permittivity is commonly referred to as ε_{∞} (or sometimes ε_{opt}). At the plasma frequency and below, dielectrics behave as ideal metals, with electron gas behavior. The static permittivity is a good approximation for alternating fields of low frequencies, and as the frequency increases a measurable phase difference δ emerges between D and E. The frequency at which the phase shift becomes noticeable depends on temperature and the details of the medium. For moderate field strength (E_{o}), D and E remain proportional, and

$$\hat{\varepsilon} = \frac{D_0}{E_0} = |\varepsilon|e^{-i\delta} ~.$$

Since the response of materials to alternating fields is characterized by a complex permittivity, it is natural to separate its real and imaginary parts, which is done by convention in the following way:

$$\hat{\varepsilon}(\omega) = \varepsilon'(\omega) - i\varepsilon''(\omega) = \left| \frac{D_0}{E_0} \right| \left( \cos \delta  - i\sin \delta  \right) ~.$$

where

- ε′ is the real part of the permittivity;
- -ε″ is the imaginary part of the permittivity;
- δ is the loss angle.

The choice of sign for time-dependence, e^{−iωt}, dictates the sign convention for the imaginary part of permittivity.

The complex permittivity is usually a complicated function of frequency ω, since it is a superimposed description of dispersion phenomena occurring at multiple frequencies. The dielectric function ε(ω) must have poles only for frequencies with positive imaginary parts, and therefore satisfies the Kramers–Kronig relations. However, in the narrow frequency ranges that are often studied in practice, the permittivity can be approximated as frequency-independent or by model functions.

At a given frequency, ε″, leads to absorption loss if it is positive (in the above sign convention) and gain if it is negative. More generally, the imaginary parts of the eigenvalues of the anisotropic dielectric tensor should be considered.

In the case of solids, the complex dielectric function is intimately connected to band structure. The primary quantity that characterizes the electronic structure of any crystalline material is the probability of photon absorption, which is directly related to the imaginary part of the optical dielectric function ε(ω). The optical dielectric function is given by the fundamental expression:

$$\varepsilon(\omega) = 1 + \frac{8\pi^2 e^2}{m^2}\sum_{c,v}\int W_{c,v}(E) \bigl( \varphi (\hbar \omega - E) - \varphi( \hbar\omega + E) \bigr) \, \mathrm{d}x ~.$$

In this expression, W_{c,v}(E) represents the product of the Brillouin zone-averaged transition probability at the energy E with the joint density of states, J_{c,v}(E); φ is a broadening function, representing the role of scattering in smearing out the energy levels. In general, the broadening is intermediate between Lorentzian and Gaussian; for an alloy it is somewhat closer to Gaussian because of strong scattering from statistical fluctuations in the local composition on a nanometer scale.

=== Tensorial permittivity ===
According to the Drude model of magnetized plasma, a more general expression which takes into account the interaction of the carriers with an alternating electric field at millimeter and microwave frequencies in an axially magnetized semiconductor requires the expression of the permittivity as a non-diagonal tensor:

$$\mathbf{D}(\omega) = \begin{vmatrix}
\varepsilon_1 & -i \varepsilon_2 & 0 \\
i \varepsilon_2 &    \varepsilon_1 & 0 \\
0             &    0             & \varepsilon_z \\
\end{vmatrix} \; \operatorname{\mathbf{E}}(\omega)$$

If ε_{2} vanishes, then the tensor is diagonal but not proportional to the identity and the medium is said to be a uniaxial medium, which has similar properties to a uniaxial crystal.

=== Classification of materials ===
Classification of materials based on permittivity
ε_{r}″/ε_{r}′	Current conduction	Field propagation
0		perfect dielectric lossless medium
$\ll 1$	low-conductivity material poor conductor	low-loss medium good dielectric
$\approx 1$	lossy conducting material	lossy propagation medium
$\gg 1$	high-conductivity material good conductor	high-loss medium poor dielectric
$\infty$	perfect conductor	

Materials can be classified according to their complex-valued permittivity ε, upon comparison of its real ε′ and imaginary ε″ components (or, equivalently, conductivity, σ, when accounted for in the latter). A perfect conductor has infinite conductivity, σ = ∞, while a perfect dielectric is a material that has no conductivity at all, σ = 0; this latter case, of real-valued permittivity (or complex-valued permittivity with zero imaginary component) is also associated with the name lossless media. Generally, when $\frac{\sigma}{\omega \epsilon} \ll 1$ we consider the material to be a low-loss dielectric (although not exactly lossless), whereas $\frac{\sigma}{\omega \epsilon} \gg 1$ is associated with a good conductor; such materials with non-negligible conductivity yield a large amount of loss that inhibit the propagation of electromagnetic waves, thus are also said to be lossy media. Those materials that do not fall under either limit are considered to be general media.

=== Lossy media ===
In the case of a lossy medium, i.e. when the conduction current is not negligible, the total current density flowing is:

$$J_\text{tot} = J_\mathrm{c} + J_\mathrm{d} = \sigma E + i \omega \varepsilon' E = i \omega \hat{\varepsilon} E$$

where

- σ is the conductivity of the medium;
- $\varepsilon' = \varepsilon_0 \varepsilon_\mathsf{r}$ is the real part of the permittivity.
- $\hat{\varepsilon} = \varepsilon' - i \varepsilon''$ is the complex permittivity

Note that this is using the electrical engineering convention of the complex conjugate ambiguity; the physics/chemistry convention involves the complex conjugate of these equations.

The size of the displacement current is dependent on the frequency ω of the applied field E; there is no displacement current in a constant field.

In this formalism, the complex permittivity is defined as:

$$\hat{\varepsilon} = \varepsilon' \left(1 - i \frac{\sigma}{\omega \varepsilon'} \right) = \varepsilon' - i \frac{\sigma}{\omega}$$

In general, the absorption of electromagnetic energy by dielectrics is covered by a few different mechanisms that influence the shape of the permittivity as a function of frequency:

- First are the relaxation effects associated with permanent and induced molecular dipoles. At low frequencies, the field changes slowly enough to allow dipoles to reach equilibrium before the field has measurably changed. For frequencies at which dipole orientations cannot follow the applied field because of the viscosity of the medium, absorption of the field's energy leads to energy dissipation. The mechanism of dipoles relaxing is called dielectric relaxation and for ideal dipoles is described by classic Debye relaxation.
- Second are the resonance effects, which arise from the rotations or vibrations of atoms, ions, or electrons. These processes are observed in the neighborhood of their characteristic absorption frequencies.

The above effects often combine to cause non-linear effects within capacitors. For example, dielectric absorption refers to the inability of a capacitor that has been charged for a long time to completely discharge when briefly discharged. Although an ideal capacitor would remain at zero volts after being discharged, real capacitors will develop a small voltage, a phenomenon that is also called soakage or battery action. For some dielectrics, such as many polymer films, the resulting voltage may be less than 1–2% of the original voltage. However, it can be as much as 15–25% in the case of electrolytic capacitors or supercapacitors.

=== Quantum-mechanical interpretation ===
In terms of quantum mechanics, permittivity is explained by atomic and molecular interactions.

At low frequencies, molecules in polar dielectrics are polarized by an applied electric field, which induces periodic rotations. For example, at the microwave frequency, the microwave field causes the periodic rotation of water molecules, sufficient to break hydrogen bonds. The field does work against the bonds and the energy is absorbed by the material as heat. This is why microwave ovens work very well for materials containing water. There are two maxima of the imaginary component (the absorptive index) of water, one at the microwave frequency, and the other at far ultraviolet (UV) frequency. Both of these resonances are at higher frequencies than the operating frequency of microwave ovens.

At moderate frequencies, the energy is too high to cause rotation, yet too low to affect electrons directly, and is absorbed in the form of resonant molecular vibrations. In water, this is where the absorptive index starts to drop sharply, and the minimum of the imaginary permittivity is at the frequency of blue light (optical regime).

At high frequencies (such as UV and above), molecules cannot relax, and the energy is purely absorbed by atoms, exciting electron energy levels. Thus, these frequencies are classified as ionizing radiation.

While carrying out a complete ab initio (that is, first-principles) modelling is now computationally possible, it has not been widely applied yet. Thus, a phenomenological model is accepted as being an adequate method of capturing experimental behaviors. The Debye model and the Lorentz model use a first-order and second-order (respectively) lumped system parameter linear representation (such as an RC and an LRC resonant circuit).

== Measurement ==
The relative permittivity of a material can be found by a variety of static electrical measurements. The complex permittivity is evaluated over a wide range of frequencies by using different variants of dielectric spectroscopy, covering nearly 21 orders of magnitude from 10^{−6} to 10^{15} hertz. Also, by using cryostats and ovens, the dielectric properties of a medium can be characterized over an array of temperatures. In order to study systems for such diverse excitation fields, a number of measurement setups are used, each adequate for a special frequency range.

Various microwave measurement techniques are outlined in Chen et al. Typical errors for the Hakki–Coleman method employing a puck of material between conducting planes are about 0.3%.

- Low-frequency time domain measurements (10^{−6} to 10^{3} Hz)
- Low-frequency frequency domain measurements (10^{−5} to 10^{6} Hz)
- Reflective coaxial methods (10^{6} to 10^{10} Hz)
- Transmission coaxial method (10^{8} to 10^{11} Hz)
- Quasi-optical methods (10^{9} to 10^{10} Hz)
- Terahertz time-domain spectroscopy (10^{11} to 10^{13} Hz)
- Fourier-transform methods (10^{11} to 10^{15} Hz)

At infrared and optical frequencies, a common technique is ellipsometry. Dual polarisation interferometry is also used to measure the complex refractive index for very thin films at optical frequencies.

For the 3D measurement of dielectric tensors at optical frequency, Dielectric tensor tomography can be used.

== See also ==
- Acoustic attenuation
- Density functional theory
- Electric-field screening
- Green–Kubo relations
- Green's function (many-body theory)
- Linear response function
- Permeability (electromagnetism)
- Rotational Brownian motion
