= Clausius–Mossotti relation =

Equation for a material's dielectric constant given its atomic polarizability

In electromagnetism, the Clausius–Mossotti relation, named for O. F. Mossotti and Rudolf Clausius, expresses the dielectric constant (relative permittivity ε_{r}) of a material in terms of the atomic polarizability α of the material's constituent atoms and/or molecules, or a homogeneous mixture thereof. It is equivalent to the Lorentz–Lorenz equation, which relates the refractive index (rather than the dielectric constant) of a substance to its polarizability. It may be expressed in SI units as
$$\frac{\varepsilon_\text{r} - 1}{\varepsilon_\text{r} + 2} = \frac{N \alpha}{3\varepsilon_0},$$
where

$\varepsilon_\text{r} = \varepsilon/\varepsilon_0$ is the dielectric constant of the material, which for non-magnetic materials is equal to n^{2}, where n is the refractive index;
ε_{0} is the permittivity of free space;
N is the number density of the molecules (m^{−3});
α is the molecular polarizability (C·m^{2}/V).

In the case that the material consists of a mixture of two or more species, the right side of the above equation would consist of the sum of the molecular polarizability contribution from each species, indexed by i in the following form:
$$\frac{\varepsilon_\text{r} - 1}{\varepsilon_\text{r} + 2} = \sum_i \frac{N_i \alpha_i}{3\varepsilon_0}.$$

In the CGS system of units the Clausius–Mossotti relation is typically rewritten to show the molecular polarizability volume $\alpha' = \frac{\alpha}{4\pi\varepsilon_0},$ which has units of volume (cm^{3}). Confusion may arise from the practice of using the shorter name "molecular polarizability" for both $\alpha$ and $\alpha'$ within literature intended for the respective unit system.

The Clausius–Mossotti relation assumes only an induced dipole relevant to its polarizability and is thus inapplicable for substances with a significant permanent dipole. It is applicable to gases such as N_{2}, CO_{2}, CH_{4} and H_{2} at sufficiently low densities and pressures. For example, the Clausius–Mossotti relation is accurate for N_{2} gas up to 1000 atm between 25 °C and 125 °C. Moreover, the Clausius–Mossotti relation may be applicable to substances if the applied electric field is at a sufficiently high frequencies such that any permanent dipole modes are inactive.

== Lorentz–Lorenz equation ==
The Lorentz–Lorenz equation is similar to the Clausius–Mossotti relation, except that it relates the refractive index (rather than the dielectric constant) of a substance to its polarizability. The Lorentz–Lorenz equation is named after the Danish mathematician and scientist Ludvig Lorenz, who published it in 1869, and the Dutch physicist Hendrik Lorentz, who discovered it independently in 1878.

The most general form of the Lorentz–Lorenz equation is (in Gaussian-CGS units)
$$\frac{n^2 - 1}{n^2 + 2} = \frac{4 \pi}{3} N \alpha_\text{m},$$
where n is the refractive index, N is the number of molecules per unit volume, and $\alpha_\text{m}$ is the mean polarizability. This equation is approximately valid for homogeneous solids, as well as liquids and gases.

When the square of the refractive index is $n^2 \approx 1$, as it is for many gases, the equation reduces to
$$n^2 - 1 \approx 4 \pi N \alpha_\text{m}$$
or simply
$$n - 1 \approx 2 \pi N \alpha_\text{m}.$$

This applies to gases at ordinary pressures. The refractive index n of the gas can then be expressed in terms of the molar refractivity A as
$$n \approx \sqrt{1 + \frac{3 A p}{R T}},$$
where p is the pressure of the gas, R is the universal gas constant, and T is the (absolute) temperature, which together determine the number density N.

== Bibliography ==
- Lakhtakia, A (1996). Selected papers on linear optical composite materials. Bellingham, Wash., USA: SPIE Optical Engineering Press. ISBN 978-0-8194-2152-4. OCLC 34046175.
- Böttcher, C. J. F. (1973). Theory of Electric Polarization (2nd ed.). Elsevier. doi:10.1016/c2009-0-15579-4. ISBN 978-0-444-41019-1.
- Clausius, R. (2013) [1879]. Die Mechanische Behandlung der Electricität (in German). Wiesbaden: Vieweg+Teubner Verlag. doi:10.1007/978-3-663-20232-5. ISBN 978-3-663-19891-8.
- Born, Max; Wolf, Emil (1999). "section 2.3.3". Principles of Optics: Electromagnetic Theory of Propagation, Interference and Diffraction of Light (7th ed.). Cambridge New York: Cambridge University Press. ISBN 0-521-64222-1. OCLC 40200160.
- Lorenz, Ludvig (1870). "Experimentale og theoretiske Undersøgelser over Legemernes Brydningsforhold". Vidensk. Slsk. Sckrifter (in Danish). 8: 205.
- Lorenz, L. (1880). "Ueber die Refractionsconstante". Annalen der Physik und Chemie (in German). 247 (9). Wiley: 70–103. Bibcode:1880AnP...247...70L. doi:10.1002/andp.18802470905. ISSN 0003-3804.
- Lorentz, H. A. (1881). "Ueber die Anwendung des Satzes vom Virial in der kinetischen Theorie der Gase". Annalen der Physik (in German). 248 (1). Wiley: 127–136. Bibcode:1881AnP...248..127L. doi:10.1002/andp.18812480110. ISSN 0003-3804.
- O. F. Mossotti (1850). "Discussione analitica sull'influenza che l'azione di un mezzo dielettrico ha sulla distribuzione dell'elettricità alla superficie di più corpi electrici disseminati in esso". Memorie di Mathematica e di Fisica della Società Italiana della Scienza Residente in Modena (in Italian). 24: 49–74.
