= Molar refractivity =

Molar refractivity, $R_\mathrm{m}$, is a measure of the total polarizability of a mole of a substance.

For a perfect dielectric which is made of one type of molecule, the molar refractivity is proportional to the polarizability of a single molecule of the substance. For real materials, intermolecular interactions (the effect of the induced dipole moment of one molecule on the field felt by nearby molecules) give rise to a density dependence.

The molar refractivity is commonly expressed as a sum of components, where the leading order is the value for a perfect dielectric, followed by the density-dependent corrections:

$$R_m = A + B\cdot\rho + C\cdot\rho^2 + ...$$

The coefficients $A, B, C, ...$ are called the refractivity virial coefficients. Some research papers are dedicated to finding the values of the subleading coefficients of different substances. In other contexts, the material can be assumed to be approximately perfect, so that the only coefficient of interest is $A$.

The coefficients depend on the wavelength of the applied field (and on the type and composition of the material), but not on thermodynamic state variables such as temperature or pressure.

The leading order (perfect dielectric) molar refractivity is defined as

$$A = \frac{4 \pi}{3} N_A \alpha_\mathrm{m},$$

where $N_A \approx 6.022 \times 10^{23}$ is the Avogadro constant and $\alpha_\mathrm{m}$ is the mean polarizability of a molecule.

== Lorentz–Lorenz ==
Substituting the molar refractivity into the Lorentz–Lorenz formula gives, for gasses

$$\frac{n^2 - 1}{n^2 + 2} = A \frac{p}{RT}$$

where $n$ is the refractive index, $p$ is the pressure of the gas, $R$ is the universal gas constant, and $T$ is the (absolute) temperature; the ideal gas law was used here to convert the particle density (appearing in the Lorentz-Lorenz formula) to pressure and temperature. (The Clausius–Mossotti variation would have the relative permittivity $\epsilon_{r}$ in place of $n^2$.)

For a gas, $n^2 \approx 1$, so the molar refractivity can be approximated by

$$A = \frac{R T}{p} \frac{n^2 - 1}{3}.$$

As mentioned above, despite the relation imposed by the last expression on $A, T, p$ and $n$, the molar refractivity $A$ is a function of the substance itself and not of its conditions, and therefore does not depend on the three state variables appearing in the right hand side of the expression. (Note: $n$ depends on $T$ and $p$, and their variations cancel out in this expression; the advantage in extracting $A$ and presenting it as a combination of the other quantities is that it gives an experimental way to measure $A$ (one simply needs to measure $n$ for a gas with known temperature and pressure).)

In terms of density ρ and molecular weight M, it can be shown via the molar version of the ideal gas law ($p = \rho \frac{R}{M} T$) that:

$$A = \frac{M}{\rho} \frac{n^2 - 1}{n^2 + 2} \approx \frac{M}{\rho} \frac{n^2 - 1}{3}.$$

== Bibliography ==
- Born, Max, and Wolf, Emil, Principles of Optics: Electromagnetic Theory of Propagation, Interference and Diffraction of Light (7th ed.), section 2.3.3, Cambridge University Press (1999) ISBN 0-521-64222-1
