= Refractometry =

Refractometry is the analytical method of measuring substances' refractive index (one of their fundamental physical properties) in order to, for instance, assess their composition or purity. A refractometer is the instrument used to measure refractive index ("RI"). Although refractometers are best known for measuring liquids, they are also used to measure gases and solids, such as glass and gemstones.

The RI of a substance is strongly influenced by temperature and the wavelength of light used to measure it; therefore, care must be taken to control or compensate for temperature differences and wavelength. RI measurements are usually reported at a reference temperature of 20 degrees Celsius, which is equal to 68 degrees Fahrenheit and is considered to be room temperature. A reference wavelength of 589.3 nm (the sodium D line) is most often used. Though RI is a dimensionless quantity, it is typically reported as nD20 (or n20
D ), where the "n" represents refractive index, the "D" denotes the wavelength, and the 20 denotes the reference temperature. Therefore, the refractive index of water at 20 degrees Celsius, taken at the Sodium D Line, would be reported as 1.3330 nD20.

Refractometers are frequently used by grape growers and kiwifruit growers for Brix testing of sucrose levels in their fruit. Refractometry is also used in the gelatin industry. To convert the RI of a gelatin sol (reported in Brix) to a gelatin concentration, one need only multiply by eight-tenths (0.8). A sol with a 10.0 RI would therefore be 8% gelatin by weight. This is known to be a reliable conversion for gelatin sols as low as 1% up to over 50%.

== Types of refractometers ==
There are four main types of fluid refractometers: traditional handheld refractometers, digital handheld refractometers, Abbe refractometers, and inline process refractometers.
