= Refractometer =

Measurement tool

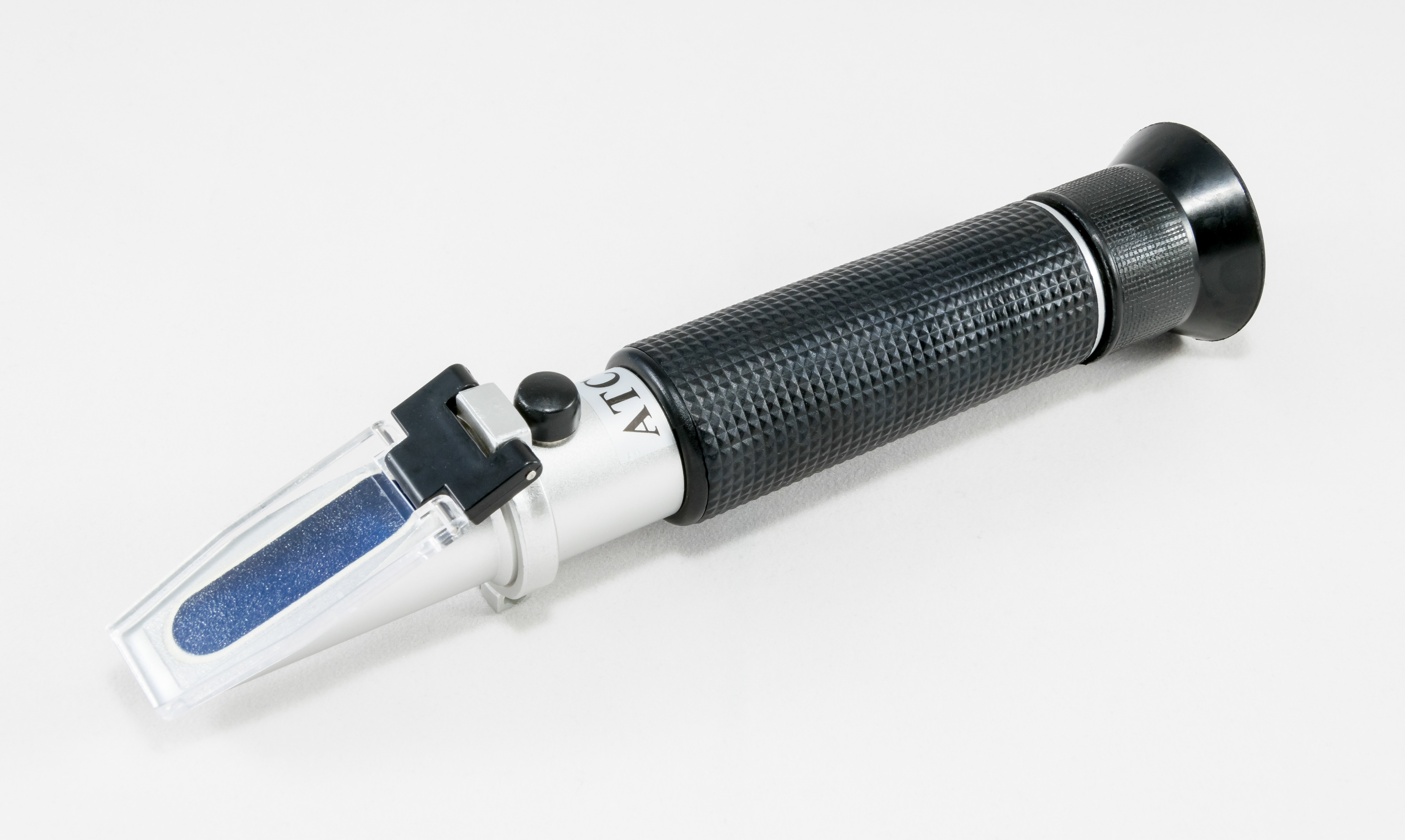
Traditional handheld refractometer

A refractometer is a laboratory or field device for the measurement of an index of refraction (refractometry). The index of refraction is calculated from the observed refraction angle using Snell's law. For mixtures, the index of refraction then allows the concentration to be determined using mixing rules such as the Gladstone–Dale relation and Lorentz–Lorenz equation.

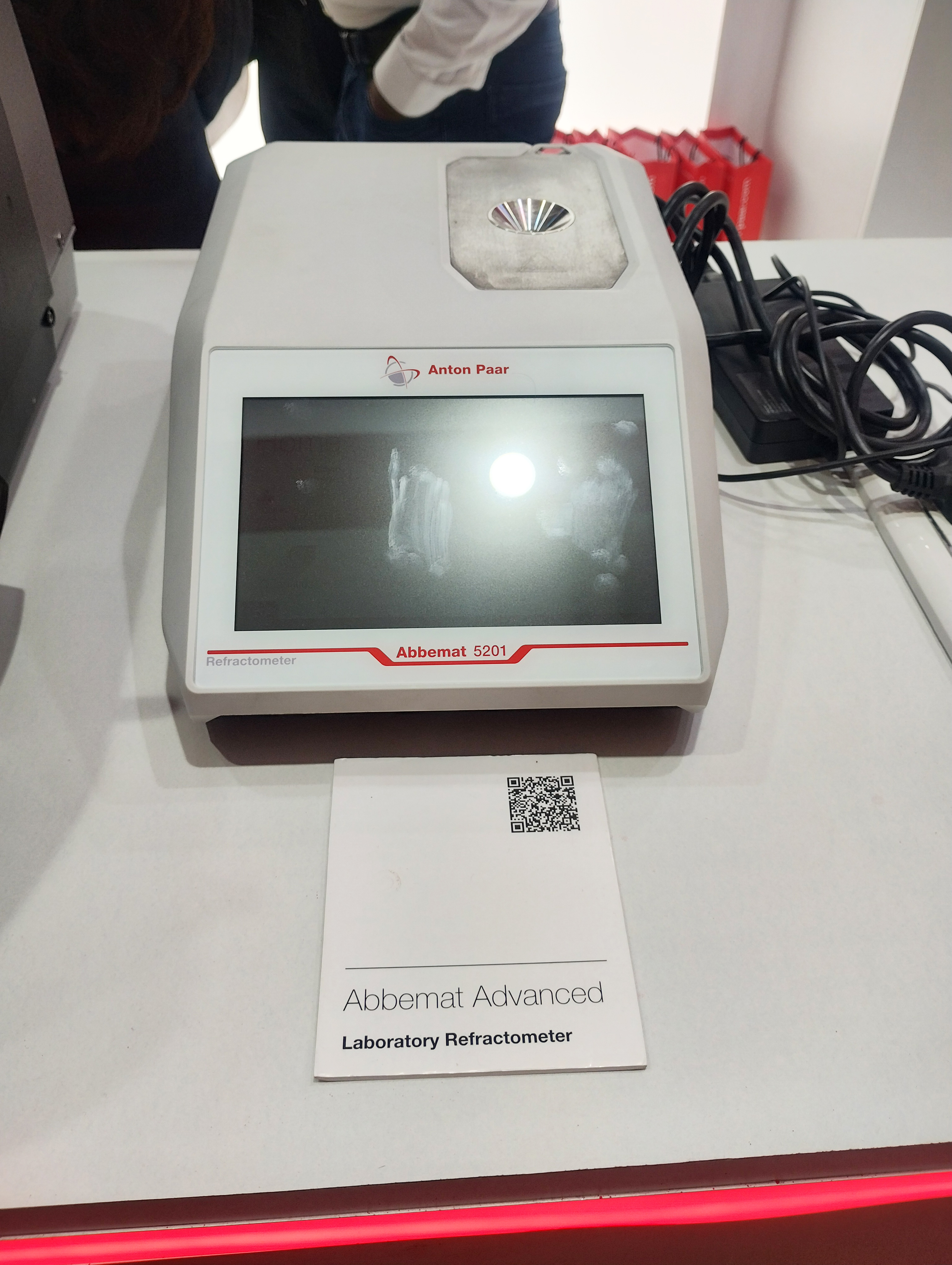
Anton Paar Laboratory Refractometer at DEF-TECH Bharat 2026, KTPO, Bengaluru

== Refractometry ==
Standard refractometers measure the extent of light refraction (as part of a refractive index) of transparent substances; this is then used in order to identify a sample, analyze the sample's purity, and determine the amount or concentration of dissolved substances within liquid samples. As light passes through the liquid from the air, it will slow down and create a 'bending' illusion. The severity of the 'bend' will depend on the amount of substance dissolved in the liquid. For example, the amount of sugar in a glass of water.

== Types ==
The construction of refractometers strongly depend on the state of matter they measure.

There are four main types of refractometers. They all use the same principle of the critical angle, pioneered by Ernst Abbe. At the optical interface of two materials, the critical angle is the smallest angle of incidence that yields total internal reflection; it can be easily observed by shining a wide range of incident angles at the interface and observing where the shadow starts. For a light shined from a material with RI of n_{2} onto its interface with a material with a lower or equal RI of n_{1}, the angle is $\theta_\text{c} = \arcsin(n_2/n_1)$. Given a known n_{2} and an observed CA, n_{1} can be calculated.

- Traditional handheld refractometers, an analogue design that projects a shadow region onto a graduated reticle.
- Digital handheld refractometers, which uses photodiodes to more accurately detect the position of the shadow line. The detected position is converted to an RI measurement by the microprocessor and displayed. They are more practically accurate than handheld ones. They use an internal LED (or other narrow-wavelength) light source, which also contributes to the (practical) accuracy as RI varies with wavelength. Some also incorporate temperature measurement.
- Laboratory or Abbe refractometers (named for Ernst Abbe), which again use the same principle but are made to be very accurate, with temperature compensation. The resulting pattern of shadowing may be read visually or (in newer digital devices) digitally.
- inline process refractometers, digital industrial devices that measure the RI and temperature of a fluid in a pipe or a tank, which is then used to estimate the concentration of the fluid.

Some specialized types also exist.

- Gemstones have high refractive indices. Gemological refractometers put a flat face of the sample on a hemicylinder made of high RI (~1.88) glass, with the contact surface being a thin film of an index-matching fluid commonly called "RI fluid" for optical contact (any trapped air would otherwise ruin the measurement). The same TIR/CA principle follows. Some incorporate a polarisation filter to measure the birefringence of gemstones, in which there are two different RIs depending on the polarisation plane of the light. Since they use the same principle of a projected shadow, gemstone refractometers are also available both as classic optical instruments and as electronic measurement devices with a digital display.
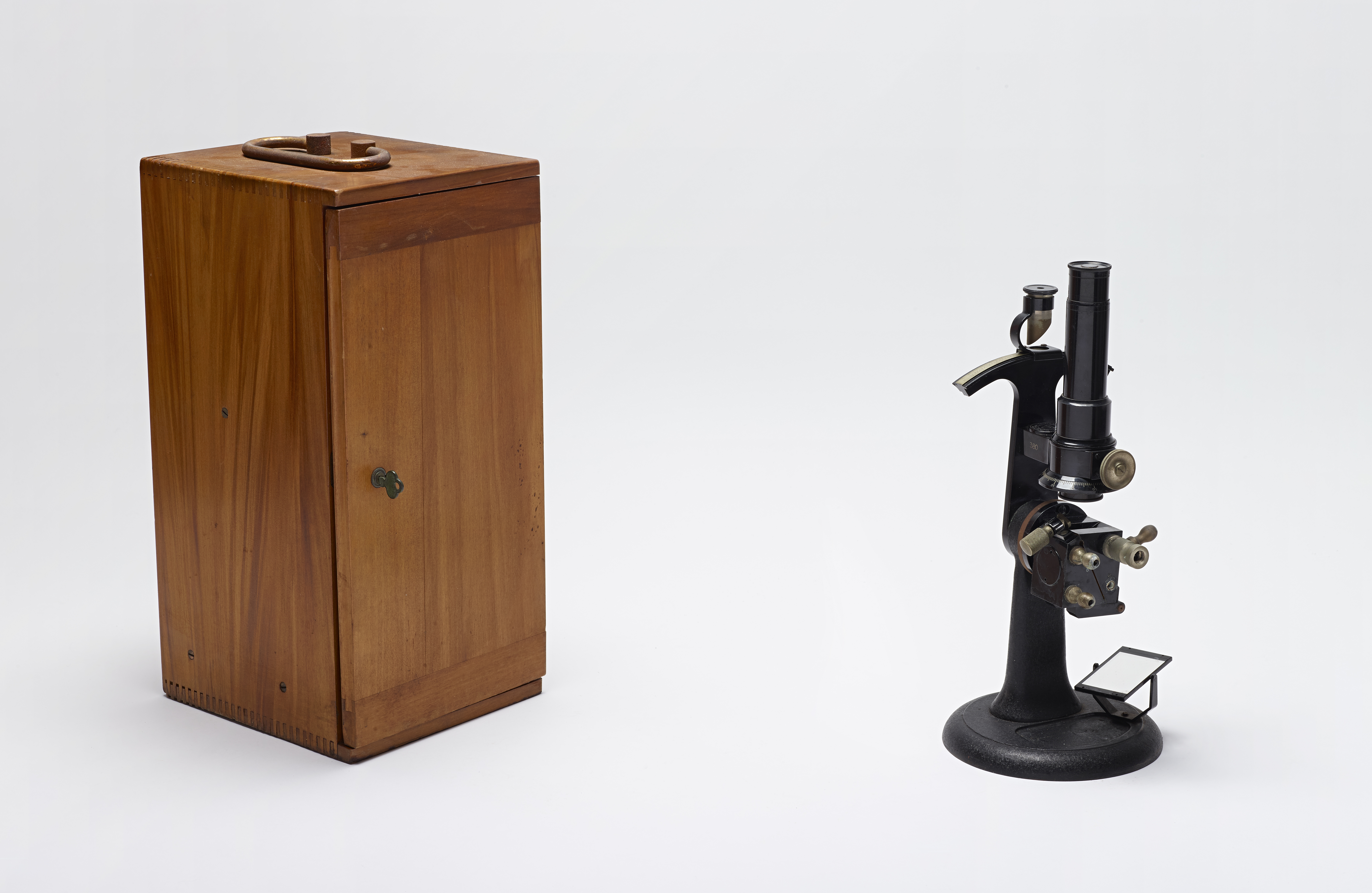
Bausch & Lomb Abbe Refractometer, ca. 1919–1926

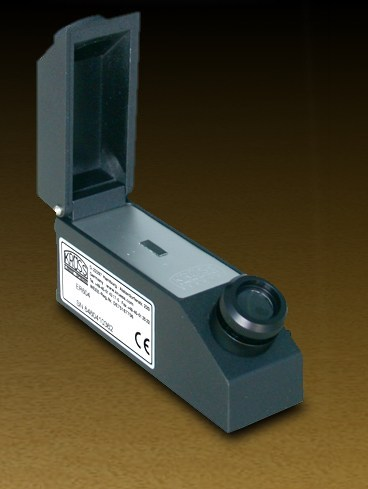
Gemology refractometer ER604 used to test light bending in gemstones; courtesy of A.KRÜSS Optronic GmbH

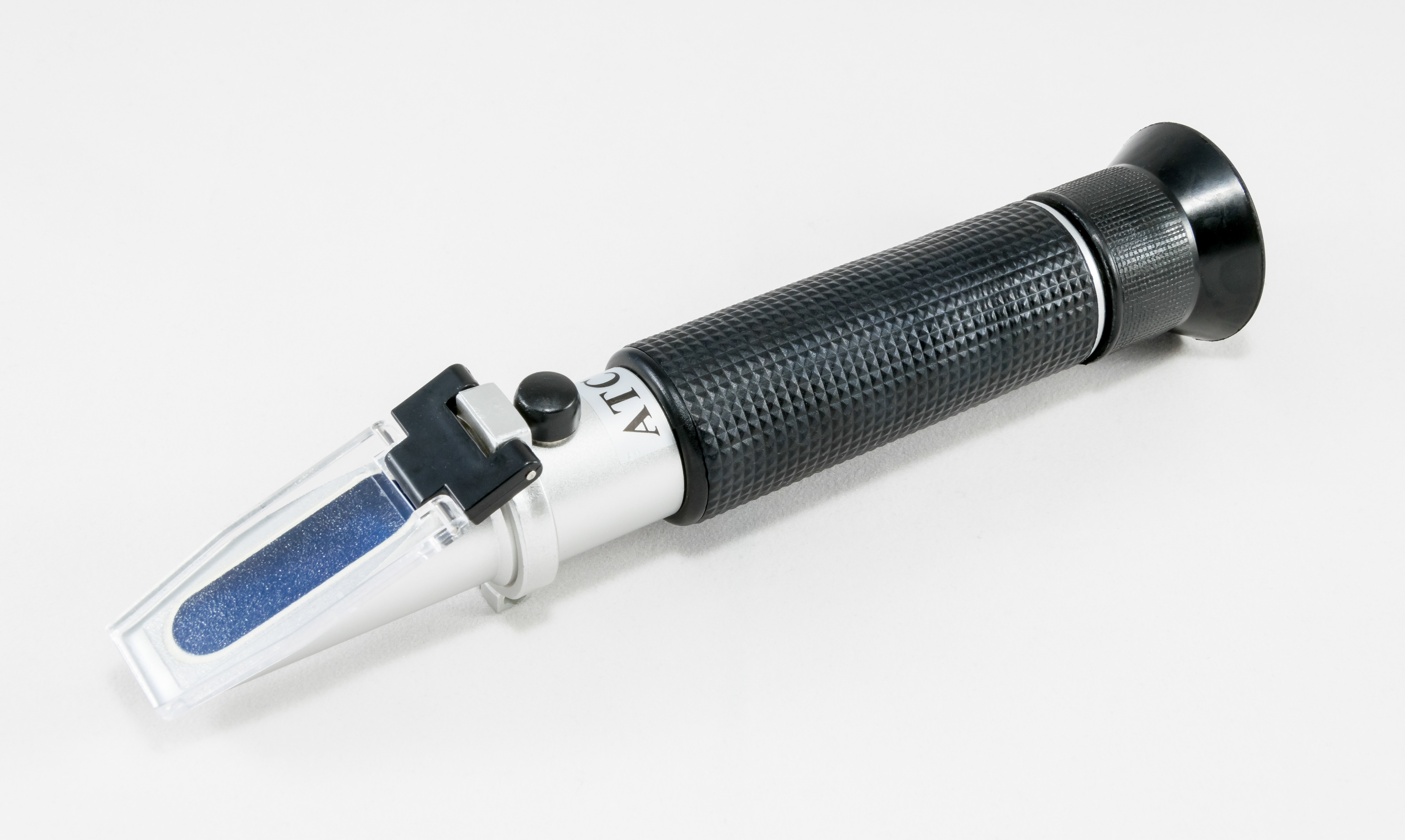
Hand refractometer

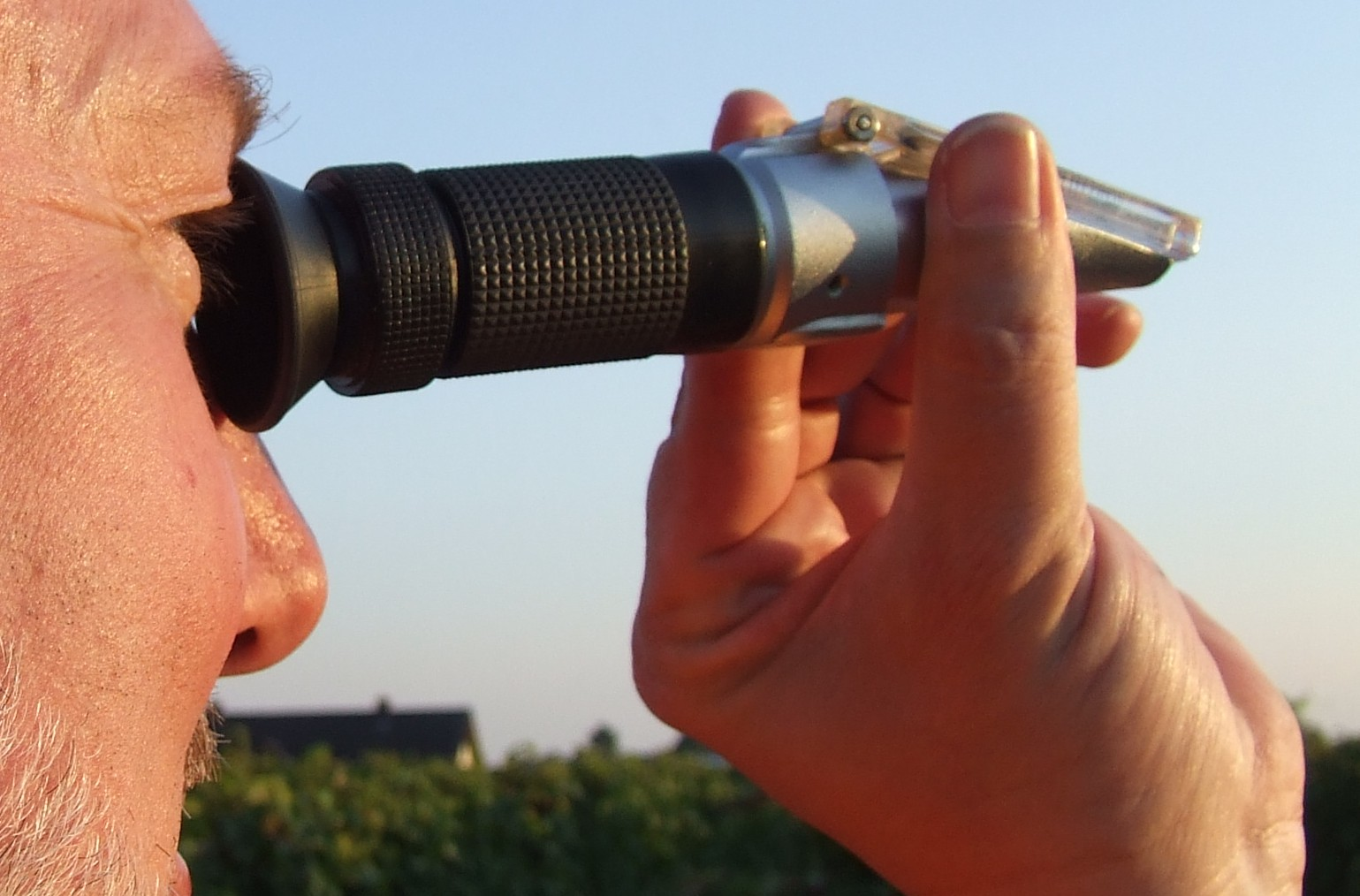
A wine grape grower with refractometer

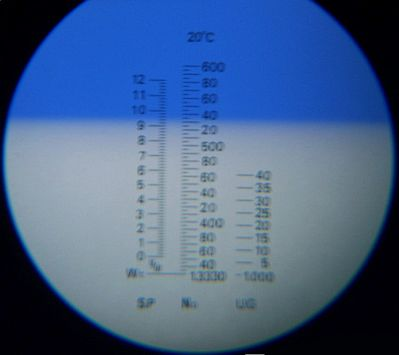
Density evaluation of abdominal fluid of a cat with feline infectious peritonitis by a refractometer.

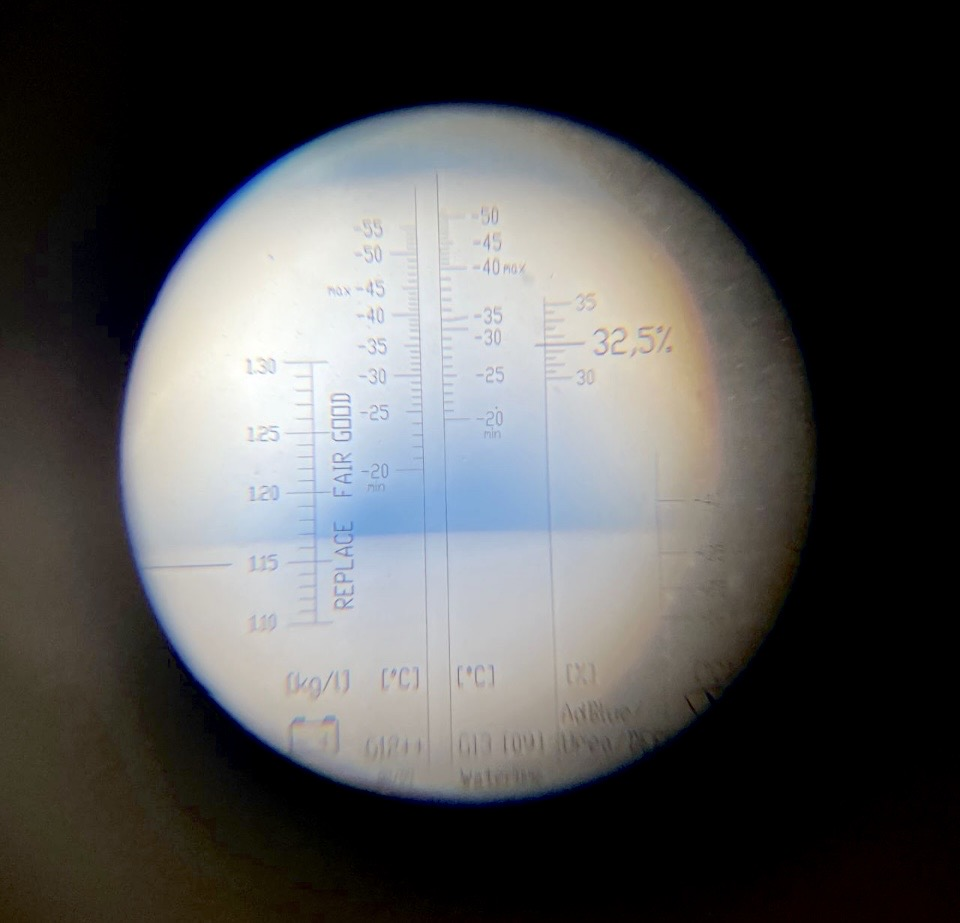
Automotive Refractometer Reading Scale for Lead Acid Battery SOC testing.

=== Gas ===
There is also the Rayleigh interference refractometer used (typically) for measuring the refractive indices of gases. These refractometers are Rayleigh interferometers which detect the optical path difference in terms of wavelengths of the light between two gas tubes of the same length. This path difference implies a ratio of the speeds of light in these two tubes, which is trivially related to a ratio of the refractive indeces.

== Factors that affect refractive index ==
The refractive indeces of materials varies with wavelength and temperature. This applies to both the sample and the refractometer's own internal prism. If the "known" refractive index of the prism is different from the actual refractive index, the resulting error is inherited into the measurement of the sample's refractive index. Much care is taken to minimize this variation.

Variation in the RI of the sample does not affect refractometry per se, but it leads to misleading results when using the RI to estimate parameters such as concentrations. This is quite pronounced in the measurement of sugar solutions in terms of refractive Brix (formally "Refractometric Dry Substance" (RDS)), see below.

=== Influence of wavelength ===
The refractive index of a given sample varies with wavelength for all materials. This dispersion relation is nonlinear and is characteristic for every material. In the visible range, a decrease of the refractive index comes with increasing wavelength. In glass prisms very little absorption is observable. In the infrared wavelength range several absorption maxima and fluctuations in the refractive index appear. To guarantee a high quality measurement with an accuracy of up to 0.00002 in the refractive index the wavelength has to be determined correctly. Therefore, in modern refractometers the wavelength is tuned to a bandwidth of +/-0.2 nm to ensure correct results for samples with different dispersions.

=== Influence of temperature ===
Temperature has a very important influence on the refractive index measurement. Therefore, the temperature of the prism and the temperature of the sample have to be controlled with high precision. There are several subtly-different designs for controlling the temperature; but there are some key factors common to all, such as high-precision temperature sensors and Peltier devices to control the temperature of the sample and the prism. The temperature control of these devices should be designed so that the variation in sample temperature is small enough that it will not cause a detectable refractive-index change.

External water baths were used in the past but are no longer needed.

== Applications ==
The refractive index and the specific gravity (density) of a solution both vary with the concentration of its solutes. As a result, refractometers are often used to "measure" the concentration of a solution or its specific gravity, carrying with the conversion an assumption that the solution being tested is sufficiently similar to the liquid being used to develop the conversion. There are optical refractometers directly graduated in terms of density or concentration, implicitly performing the conversion for the user. There are also digital versions that directly display such converted results.

=== Biomedical ===
In laboratory medicine and drug diagnostics, a liquid refractometer is used to measure the total plasma protein in a blood sample and urine specific gravity in a urine sample.

=== Water ===
In marine aquarium keeping, a refractometer is used to measure the salinity and specific gravity of the water.

In the automobile and machine industries, a refractometer is used to measure coolant concentration in water.

=== Food ===
Refractometry is commonly used to measure the concentration of a sugar solution in terms of Brix, originally a measure of the dissolved solid concentration by relating the SG of the sample to known SGs of sucrose-water solutions. The refractometric Brix, which relates RI to sucrose concentrations, is quite commonly used with many refractometers being directly graduated in Brix. The RI-to-"Brix" conversion is only strictly valid for solutions similar to what the conversion is intended for; for other solutions it would yield different amounts of errors. (The formal term for the refractometric Brix is refractometric dry substance (RDS).)

In practical use, however, these distinctions are largely forgotten and the refractometric Brix is now more commonly used than the original "Brix". Brix refractometers are used:

- In beekeeping, to measure the amount of water in honey.
- In homebrewing, to measure the amount of fermentable sugars in a wort, which will potentially be converted to alcohol.
- In home cooking, for making preserves including jams and marmalades.

A very common use for sugar-concentration scales is in the measurement of fruit ripeness. In this use Brix is accompanied by similar scales including Oechsle scale, Plato scale, Baumé scale, and Balling scale. All of these are supposed to describe the specific gravity, but the same logic used to yield the refractometric Brix has also lead to "conversions" from refractive indices into these scales.

The RDS measurements are greatly affected by the temperature of the fluid. The standard conversion is defined for 20 °C (68 °F). There are two general types of corrections: one is to compile a table of shift amounts at different combinations of temperature and apparent RDS, the basis of so-called "Automatic Temperature Compensation" (ATC). The other is to measure the apparent RDS at two different temperatures and use a linear extrapolation to the reference temperature.

=== Gemology ===
Gemstones are transparent minerals and can therefore be examined using optical methods. Refractive index is a material constant, dependent on the chemical composition of a substance. The refractometer is used to help identify gem materials by measuring their refractive index, one of the principal properties used in determining the type of a gemstone. Due to the dependence of the refractive index on the wavelength of the light used (i.e. dispersion), the measurement is normally taken at the wavelength of the sodium line D-line (Na_{D}) of ~589 nm. This is either filtered out from daylight or generated with a monochromatic light-emitting diode (LED). Certain stones such as rubies, sapphires, tourmalines and topaz are optically anisotropic. They demonstrate two different RIs based on the polarisation plane of the light, also known as birefringence, which can be measured with a polarization filter as mentioned above.

== Automatic ==
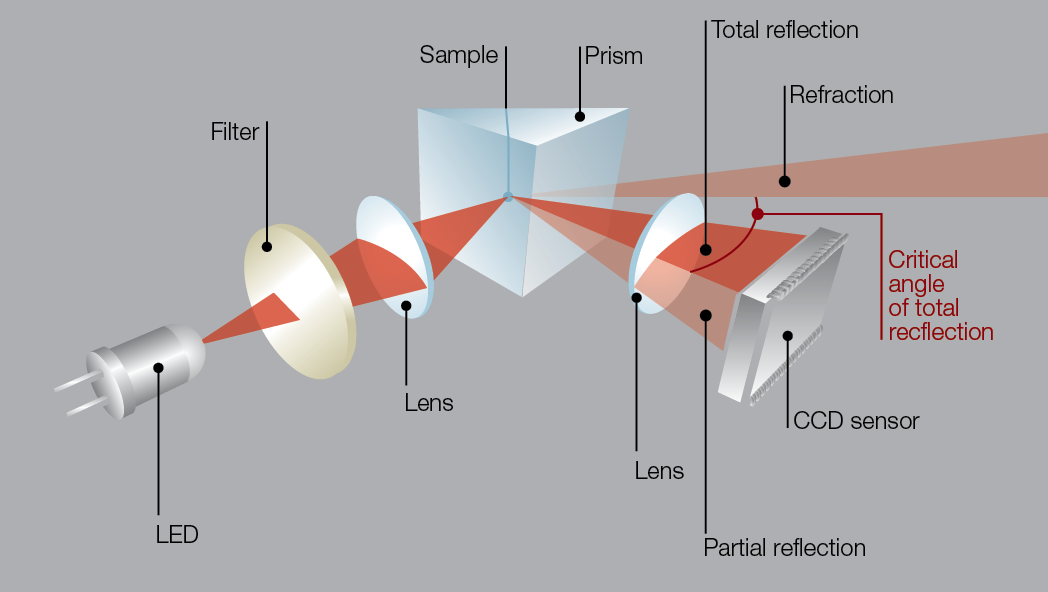
Schematic setup of an automatic refractometer: An LED light source is imaged under a wide range of angles onto a prism surface which is in contact with a sample. Depending on the difference in the refractive index between prism material and sample the light is partly transmitted or totally reflected. The critical angle of total reflection is determined by measuring the reflected light intensity as a function of the incident angle

Automatic refractometers automatically measure the refractive index of a sample. The automatic measurement of the refractive index of the sample is based on the determination of the critical angle of total reflection. A light source, usually a long-life LED, is focused onto a prism surface via a lens system. An interference filter guarantees the specified wavelength. Due to focusing light to a spot at the prism surface, a wide range of different angles is covered. As shown in the figure "Schematic setup of an automatic refractometer" the measured sample is in direct contact with the measuring prism. Depending on its refractive index, the incoming light below the critical angle of total reflection is partly transmitted into the sample, whereas for higher angles of incidence the light is totally reflected. This dependence of the reflected light intensity from the incident angle is measured with a high-resolution sensor array. From the video signal taken with the CCD sensor the refractive index of the sample can be calculated. This method of detecting the angle of total reflection is independent on the sample properties. It is even possible to measure the refractive index of optically dense strongly absorbing samples or samples containing air bubbles or solid particles . Furthermore, only a few microliters are required and the sample can be recovered. This determination of the refraction angle is independent of vibrations and other environmental disturbances.

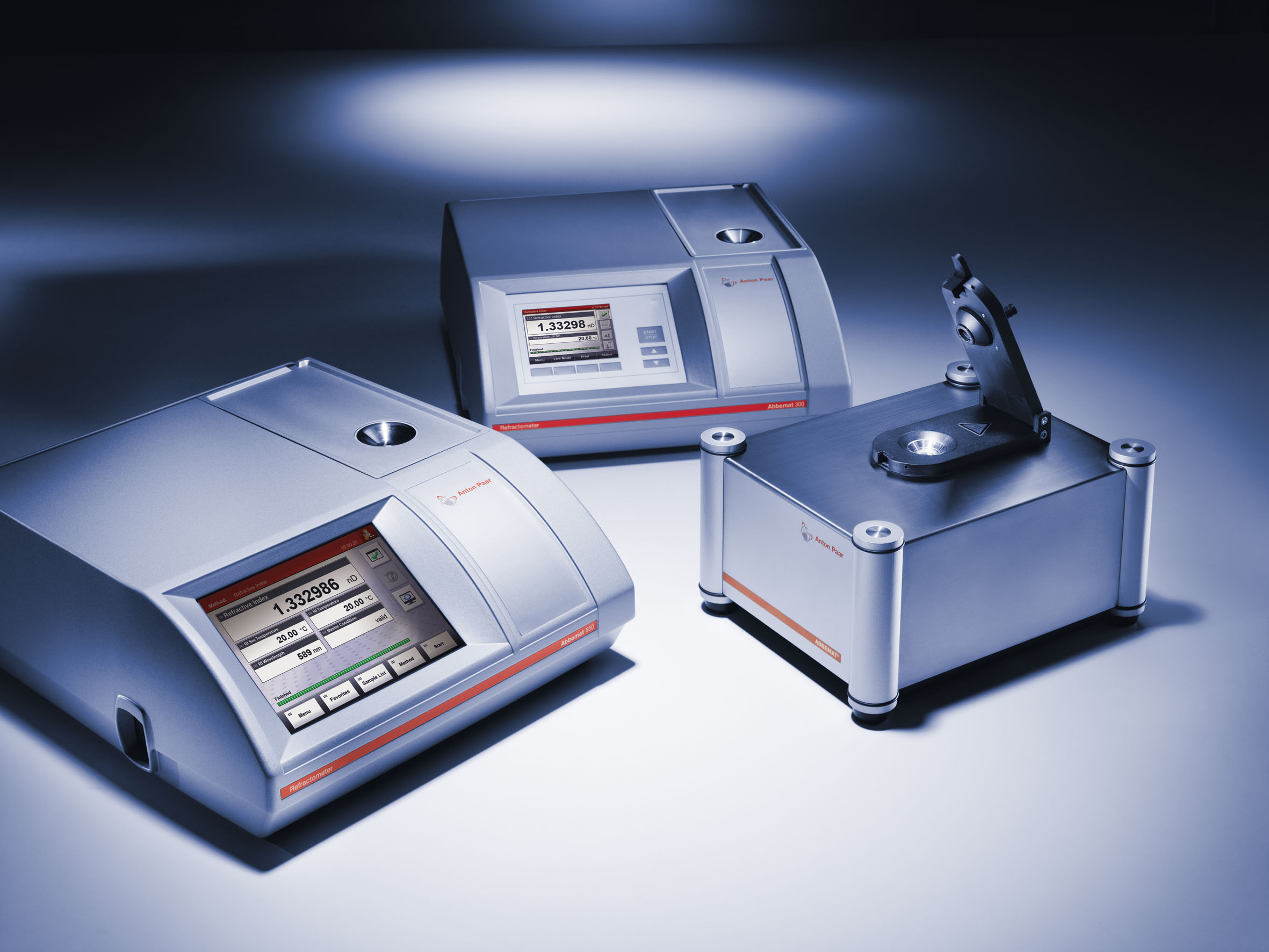
Modern Automatic Refractometers

=== Extended possibilities of automatic refractometers ===
Automatic refractometers are microprocessor-controlled electronic devices. This means they can have a high degree of automation and also be combined with other measuring devices

==== Flow cells ====
There are different types of sample cells available, ranging from a flow cell for a few microliters to sample cells with a filling funnel for fast sample exchange without cleaning the measuring prism in between. The sample cells can also be used for the measurement of poisonous and toxic samples with minimum exposure to the sample. Micro cells require only a few microliters volume, assure good recovery of expensive samples and prevent evaporation of volatile samples or solvents. They can also be used in automated systems for automatic filling of the sample onto the refractometer prism. For convenient filling of the sample through a funnel, flow cells with a filling funnel are available. These are used for fast sample exchange in quality control applications.

==== Automatic sample feeding ====
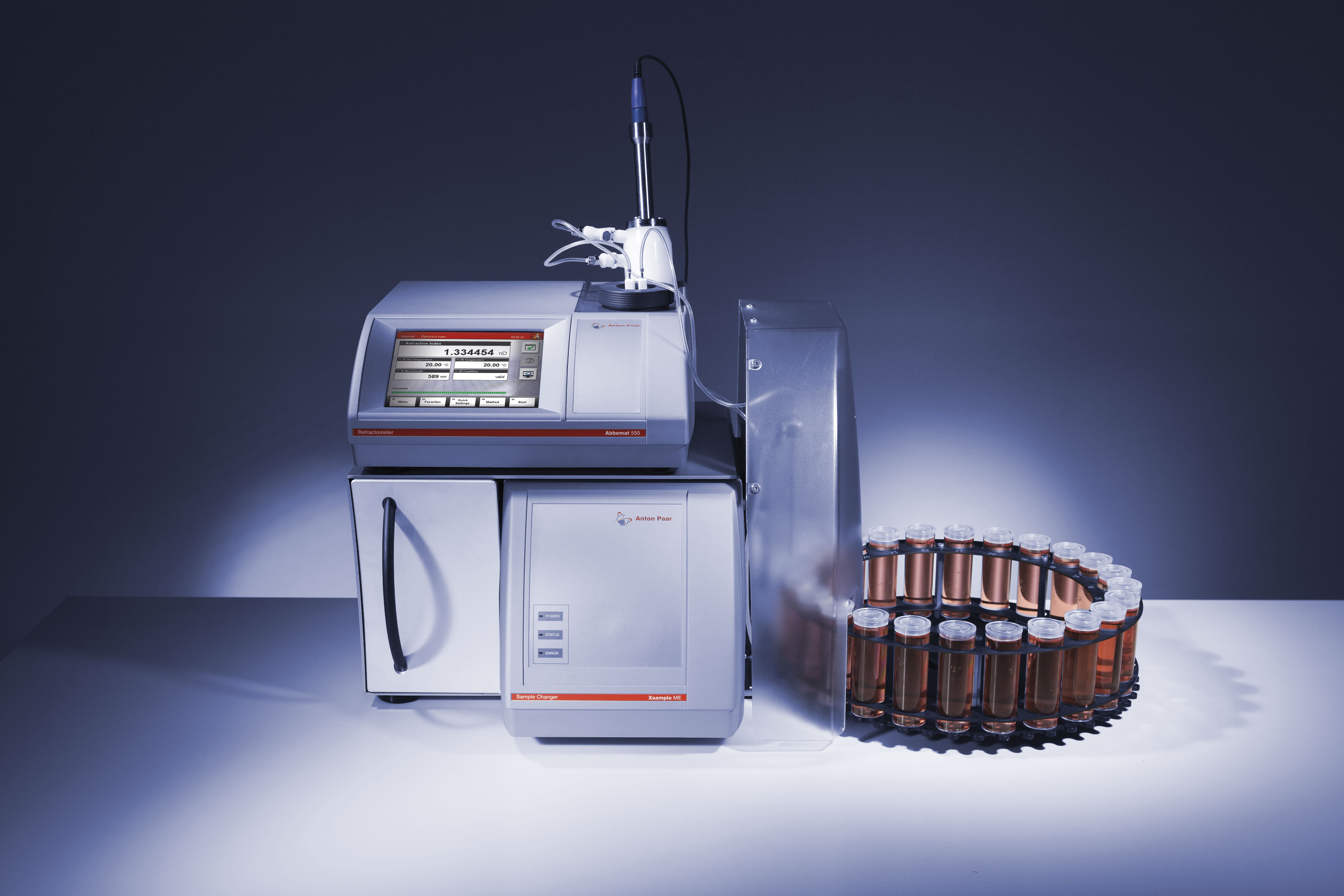
Automatic refractometer with sample changer for automatic measurement of a large number of samples

Once an automatic refractometer is equipped with a flow cell, the sample can either be filled by means of a syringe or by using a peristaltic pump. Modern refractometers have the option of a built-in peristaltic pump controlled via the instrument's software menu. A peristaltic pump opens the way to monitor batch processes in the laboratory or perform multiple measurements on one sample without any user interaction. This eliminates human error and assures a high sample throughput.

If an automated measurement of a large number of samples is required, modern automatic refractometers can be combined with an automatic sample changer. The sample changer is controlled by the refractometer and assures fully automated measurements of the samples placed in the vials of the sample changer for measurements.

==== Multiparameter measurements ====
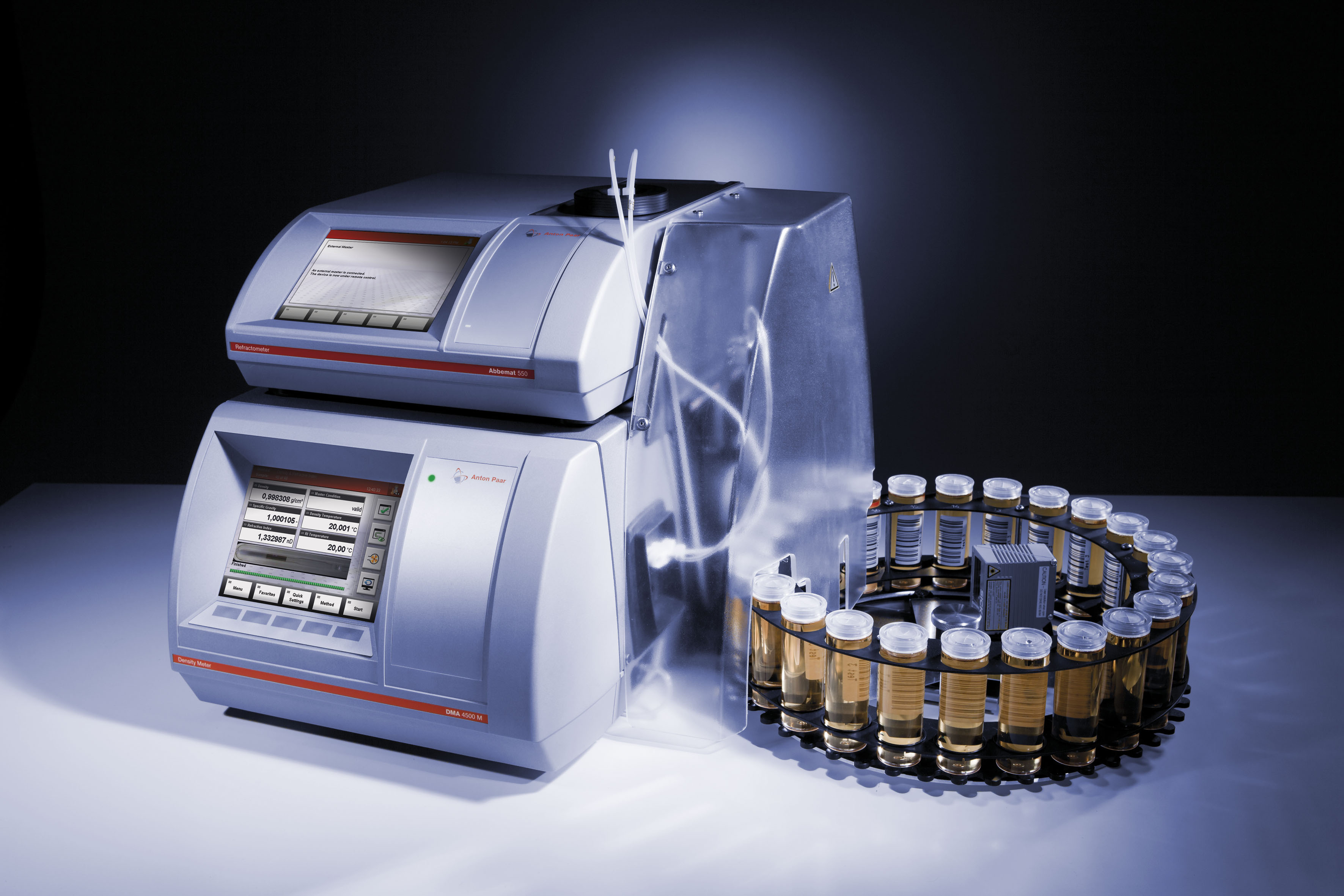
Measuring combination of an automatic refractometer and a density meter as widely used in the flavors and fragrances industry

Today's laboratories do not only want to measure the refractive index of samples, but several additional parameters like density or viscosity to perform efficient quality control. Due to the microprocessor control and a number of interfaces, automatic refractometers are able to communicate with computers or other measuring devices, e.g. density meters, pH meters or viscosity meters, to store refractive index data and density data (and other parameters) into one database.

=== Software features ===
Automatic refractometers do not only measure the refractive index, but offer a lot of additional software features, like

- Instrument settings and configuration via software menu
- Automatic data recording into a database
- User-configurable data output
- Export of measuring data
- Statistical functions
- Predefined methods for different kinds of applications
- Automatic checks and adjustments
- Check if sufficient amount of sample is on the prism
- Data recording only if the results are plausible

=== Pharma documentation and validation ===
Refractometers are often used in pharmaceutical applications for quality control of raw intermediate and final products. The manufacturers of pharmaceuticals have to follow several international regulations like FDA 21 CFR Part 11, GMP, Gamp 5, USP<1058>, which require a lot of documentation work. The manufacturers of automatic refractometers support these users providing instrument software fulfills the requirements of 21 CFR Part 11, with user levels, electronic signature and audit trail. Furthermore, Pharma Validation and Qualification Packages are available containing

- Qualification Plan (QP)
- Design Qualification (DQ)
- Risk Analysis
- Installation Qualification (IQ)
- Operational Qualification (OQ)
- Check List 21 CFR Part 11 / SOP
- Performance Qualification (PQ)

== See also ==
- Ernst Abbe
- Refractive index
- Gemology
- Must weight
- Winemaking
- Harvest (wine)
- Gravity (beer)
- High-fructose corn syrup
- Cutting fluid
- German inventors and discoverers
- High refractive index polymers
