= Carl A. Vossberg Jr. =

American electrical engineer, inventor, and entrepreneur (1918–2008)

Carl A. Vossberg, Jr., (July 16, 1918 – March 9, 2008) was an American electrical engineer, inventor, and entrepreneur in the electronic instrumentation industry. He is known for more than 30 technical patents in the area of refractometry, measurement, and control. Vossberg also founded Electron-Machine Corporation, the company responsible for the introduction of inline process refractometers as a measuring system for the pulp & paper, food, and chemical processing industries.

== Early life and education ==
Vossberg began his college education at the City College of the City of New York (CCNY), studying electronics, and was awarded a BEE in Electrical Engineering from CCNY and a MS in Electrical Engineering (EE) from Columbia University. He also attended Massachusetts Institute of Technology. During WWII, Vossberg worked for the U.S. Office of Strategic Service (now CIA) participating in the development of remote radio transponders, artillery tracking systems, weapon fire detection controllers, and video transmission.

== Career ==
Vossberg entered the profession as a radio engineer for RCA and designed circuits and established radio facsimile facilities for the Office of War information. Later he became Chief Engineer for Standard Electronics Research Corporation, where his duties were to originate and direct the research and development programs and supervise engineering and technical personnel in electronics, x-rays, communication, instrumentation and process controls. He was also Vice President of Research and Developments, Inc., and Vice President of Industrial Gauges Corporation.

=== After WWII and entrepreneurship ===
After the war, Vossberg set out to apply electronics technology to industrial applications. Electron-Machine Corporation was formed in 1946 for the purpose of designing automatic electronic gaging and indicating equipment. The company was established in the back of a radiator repair shop in Lynbrook, New York. Instruments for diameter and thickness measurements for steel and cable products were conceived, developed, and licensed to other manufacturers. These instruments included the first commercial x-ray thickness gage, optical cable diameter gages, and an industrial process control computer. In 1950 he, in partnership, formed the Industrial Gauges Corporation and later established Research Developments, Inc., as a subsidiary. This expansion provided the manufacturing facilities for the products developed by the Electron-Machine Company.

In 1952, Electron-Machine Corporation moved to Umatilla, Florida, where operations continue today. The abundant living attributed to Florida influenced Vossberg's decision to move the company to Umatilla, where laboratory buildings were constructed between two beautiful lakes to house the electronic and chemical sections. The location was chosen because it was “conducive to scientific research and can account for the Laboratories producing near miracles.”

The early efforts of Electron-Machine Corporation were directed toward solving specific problems of a custom nature involving mainly engineering development and limited production. These practices were carried into the early 1960s when a series of products appeared as a result of these custom applications. In 1963, it became apparent that the efforts of Electron-Machine Corporation were divided into a systems capability and a product line. With the limited resources available, Vossberg had to make a choice: Vossberg decided to concentrate Electron-Machine Corporation's total effort towards further development and exploitation of its product line.

The first in-line process refractometer was developed to fulfill a need within the developing concentrated Citrus industry, and the use of refractometers on numerous applications in the food, chemical, and pulp/paper industries continues throughout the world today.

== Inventions and patents ==
Carl Vossberg, Jr. was granted more than 30 technical patents during his lifetime in the areas of refractometry, measurement, and control. A partial list includes:

US2807976A - Refractometer US2549402A - X-ray measuring system US3121166A - X-ray apparatus for measuring paper web density US3724952A - Method for polarimetric analysis US2659823A - Measuring system US2823319A - Precision pulse power generator US2510485A - Electrical measuring system US2883895A - Rolling mill thickness control system US2541313A - Signal comparison indicator US2548755A - Optical area measuring system US2937327A - Pulsing methods and apparatus for the control of movable members US3096671A - Thickness control systems for rolling mills US2832108A - Methods and apparatus for the casting and solidification of molten materials US2901630A - Precision pulse power generator US2632117A - Measuring apparatus

== Death and legacy ==
Carl A. Vossberg died on March 9, 2008, in Eustis, Florida. Electron-Machine Corporation continues today under the third generation of Vossberg leadership providing refractometers in the pulp & paper, food, and chemical processing industries.
