= Traditional handheld refractometer =

Analog instrument for measuring a liquid's refractive index

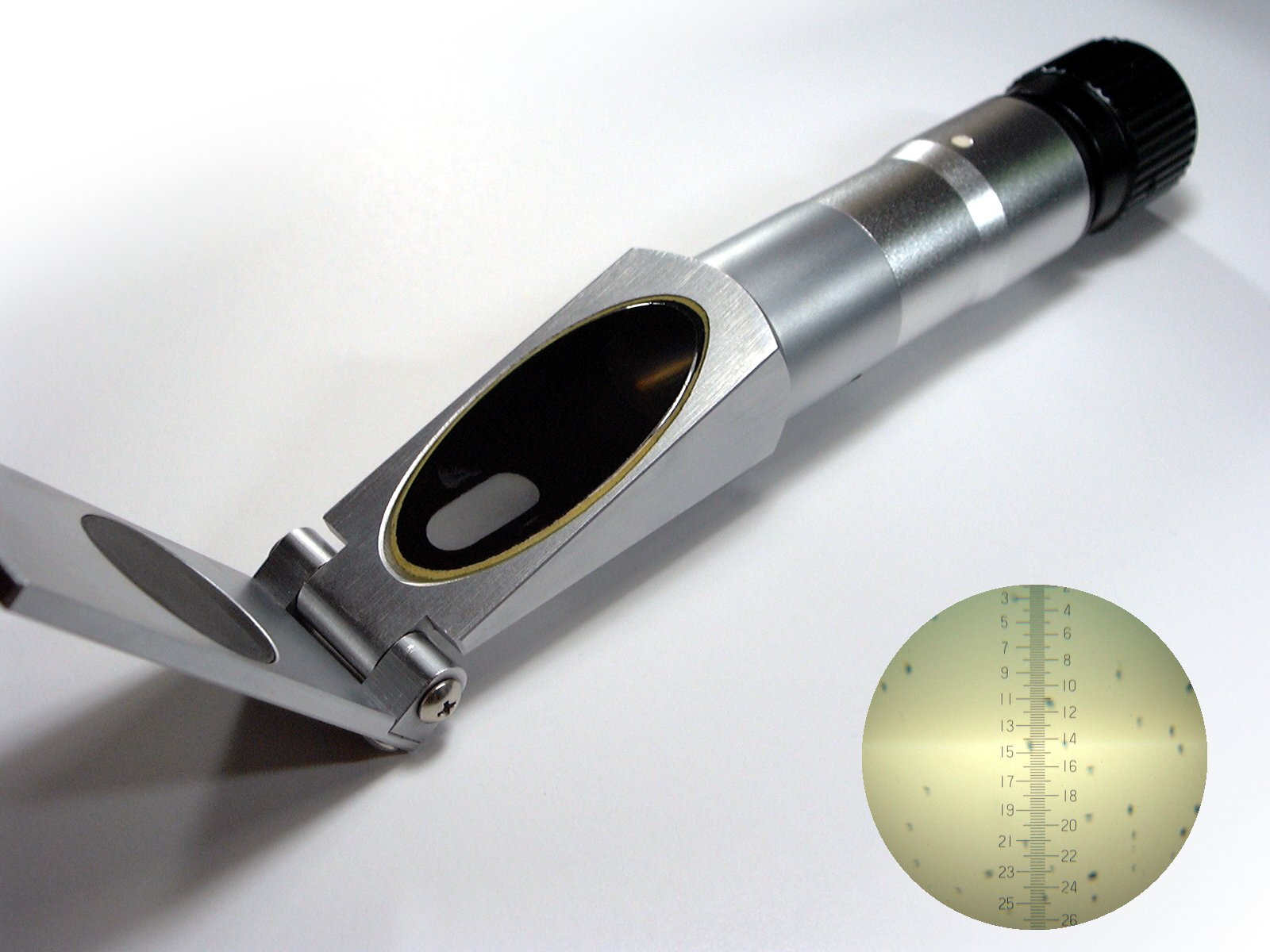
Handheld Refractometer

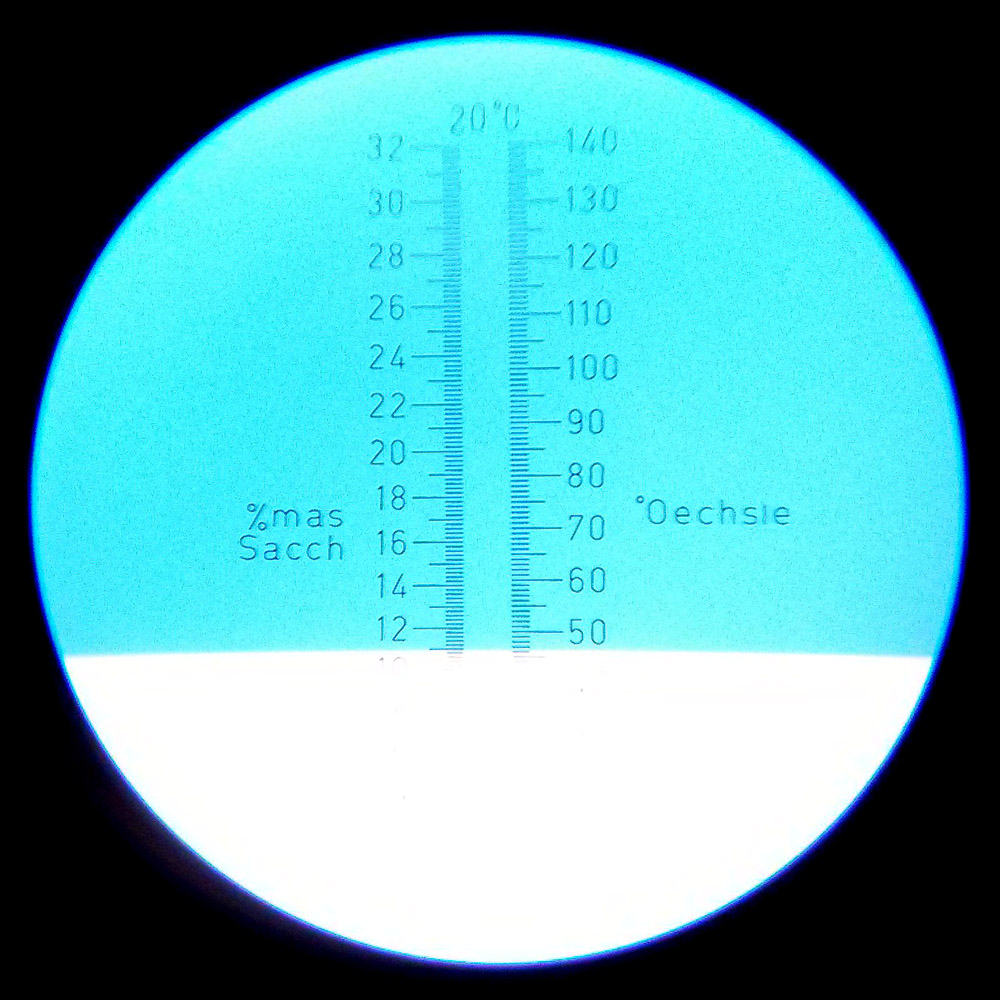
Ocular view on a handheld refractometer. Reading 46 °Oechsle.

A traditional handheld refractometer is a type of refractometer, an analog instrument for measuring a liquid's refractive index.

It works on the critical angle principle by which lenses and prisms project a shadow line onto a small glass reticle inside the instrument, which is then viewed by the user through a magnifying eyepiece. They are less precise than Digital handheld refractometers.

In use, a sample is placed between a measuring prism and a small cover plate. Light traveling through the sample is either passed through to the reticle or totally internally reflected. The net effect is that a shadow line forms between the illuminated area and the dark area. It is where this shadow line crosses the scale that a reading is taken. Because refractive index is very temperature dependent, it is important to use a refractometer with automatic temperature compensation. Compensation is accomplished through the use of a small bi-metallic strip that moves a lens or prism in response to temperature changes. This design was invented by Emanuel Goldberg. There are many types of refractometers and the most common types are Abbe's refractometer, Pulfrich refractometer, Immersion refractometer.
