= Digital handheld refractometer =

A digital handheld refractometer is an instrument for measuring the refractive index of materials. They are commonly used within food and liquid analysis.

== Principle of operation ==
Most operate on the same general critical angle principle as a traditional handheld refractometer but are more precise. The difference is that light from an LED light source is focused on the underside or a prism element. When a liquid sample is applied to the measuring surface of the prism, some of the light is transmitted through the solution and lost, while the remaining light is reflected onto a linear array of photodiodes creating a shadow line. The refractive index is directly related to the position of the shadow line on the photodiodes. Once the position of the shadow line has been automatically determined by the instrument, the internal software will correlate the position to refractive index, or to another unit of measure related to refractive index, and display a digital readout on an LCD or LED scale.

The more elements there are in the photodiode array, the more precise the readings will be, and the easier it will be to obtain readings for emulsions and other difficult-to-read fluids that form fuzzy shadow lines.

Digital handheld refractometers are generally more precise than traditional handheld refractometers, but less precise than most benchtop refractometers. They also may require a slightly larger amount of sample to read from since the sample is not spread thinly against the prism.

The result may be displayed in one of various units of measurement: Brix, freezing point, boiling point, concentration, etc. Nearly all digital refractometers feature Automatic Temperature Compensation (for Brix at least)

Most have a metal sample well around the prism, which makes it easier to clean sticky samples, and some instruments offer software to prevent extreme ambient light from interfering with readings (you can also shade the prism area to prevent this as well). Some instruments are available with multiple scales, or the ability to input a special scale using known conversion information. There are some digital handheld refractometers that are IP65 (IP Code) water-resistant, and thus washable under a running faucet.

== See also ==
- Refractometer Types
  - Traditional handheld refractometer
  - Abbe refractometer
  - Inline process refractometer
