= Abbe refractometer =

Bench-top refractometer

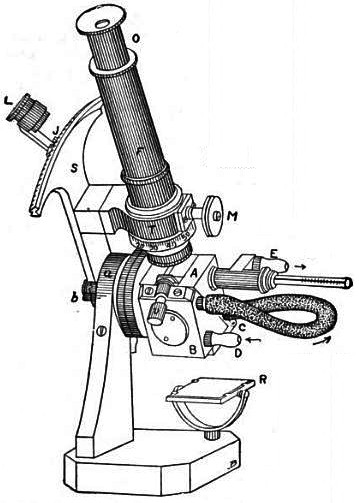
Sketch of an Abbe refractometer with temperature-controlled prisms

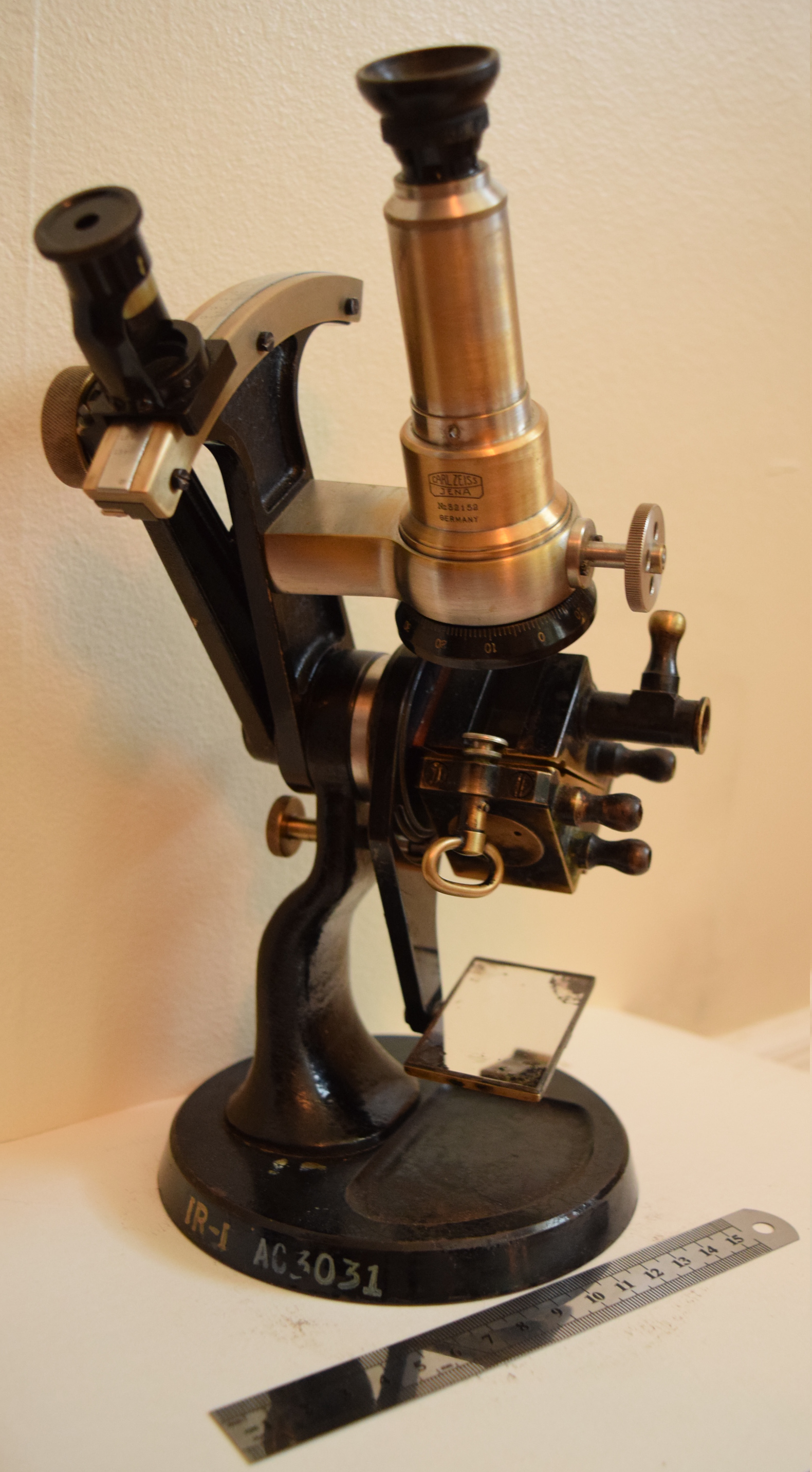
An Abbe refractometer, manufactured by Zeiss around 1920. Note that the thermometer is not attached.

An Abbe refractometer is a bench-top device for the high-precision measurement of an index of refraction.

== Details ==
Ernst Abbe (1840–1905), working for Carl Zeiss AG in Jena, Germany in the late 19th century, was the first to develop a laboratory refractometer. These first instruments had built-in thermometers and required circulating water to control instrument and fluid temperatures. They also had adjustments for eliminating the effects of dispersion and analog scales from which the readings were taken.

In the Abbe refractometer the liquid sample is sandwiched into a thin layer between an illuminating prism and a refracting prism. The refracting prism is made of a glass with a high refractive index (e.g., 1.75) and the refractometer is designed to be used with samples having a refractive index smaller than that of the refracting prism. A light source is projected through the illuminating prism, the bottom surface of which is ground (i.e., roughened like a ground-glass joint), so each point on this surface can be thought of as generating light rays traveling in all directions. A detector placed on the back side of the refracting prism would show a light and a dark region.

Over a century after Abbe's work, the usefulness and precision of refractometers has improved, although their principle of operation has changed very little. They are also possibly the easiest device to use for measuring the refractive index of solid samples, such as glass, plastics, and polymer films. Some modern Abbe refractometers use a digital display for measurement, eliminating the need for discerning between small graduations. However, the user still has to adjust the view to get a final reading.

The first truly digital laboratory refractometers began appearing in the late 1970s and early 1980s, and no longer depended on the user's eye to determine the reading. They still required the use of circulating water baths to control instrument and fluid temperature. They did, however, have the ability to electronically compensate for the temperature differences of many fluids where there is a known concentration-to-refractive-index conversion. Most digital laboratory refractometers, while much more accurate and versatile than their analog Abbe counterparts, are incapable of readings on solid samples.

In the late 1990s, Abbe refractometers became available with the capability of measurements at wavelengths other than the standard 589 nanometers. These instruments use special filters to reach the desired wavelength, and can extend measurements well into the near infrared (though a special viewer is required to see the infrared rays). Multi-wavelength Abbe refractometers can be used to easily determine a sample's Abbe number.

The most advanced instruments of today use solid-state Peltier effect devices to heat and cool the instrument and the sample, eliminating the need for an external water bath. The software on most of current instruments offers features such as programmable user-defined scales and a history function that recalls the last several measurements. Several manufacturers offer easily usable controls, with the ability to use from and export readings to a linked computer.

== See also ==
- Refractive index
- Traditional handheld refractometer
- Digital handheld refractometer
- Inline process refractometer
