= Inline process refractometer =

Continuous fluid measurement device

Inline process refractometers are a type of refractometer designed for the continuous measurement of a fluid flowing through a pipe or inside a tank. First patented by Carl A. Vossberg Jr. US2807976A - Refractometer US2549402A, these refractometers typically consist of a sensor, placed inline with the fluid flow, coupled to a control box. The control box usually provides a digital readout as well as 4-20 mA analog outputs and relay outputs for controlling pumps and valves. Instead of placing the sensor inline of the process, it can be placed in a bypass, attached by a thin tube.

This measurement has been an important element in the process control of the chemical and refining, pulp and paper, food, sugar and pharmaceutical industries for more than a century. For instance, the in-line concentration measurement can be used as a real-time predictive tool for the final concentration. A quick and accurate response is needed to optimize production. Cost reduction is possible by reducing the variation of mean average of the product concentration. The cost saving is related to the value of the component being measured.

A digital inline process refractometer sensor measures the refractive index and the temperature of the processing medium. The measurement is based on the refraction of light in the process medium, i.e. the critical angle of refraction using a light source. The measured refractive index and temperature of the process medium are sent to the control box. It calculates the concentration of the process liquid based on the refractive index and temperature, taking pre-defined process conditions into account. The output is typically a 4 to 20mA DC output or, increasingly, an Ethernet signal proportional to process solution concentration, liquid density, Brix or other scale that has been selected for the instrument.

The inline process refractometer consists of three primary components: the inline sensing head, the electronics console, and the process adapter. The inline sensing head is mounted on the adapter and contains a prism that scans the process solution through a transparent window and outputs a value relative to the refractive index of the solution. The electronics console houses all control circuitry, microprocessors, digital displays and calibration points and conditions the sensing head signal. The process adapter is the mechanical connection between the inline sensing head and the process piping, and is designed specifically to accommodate the pipe size and application.

Inline process refractometers are used primarily in the pulp and paper industry; the food and beverage industry, the pharmaceutical industry, and the chemical industry as a means to assure consistency and quality. In the pulp and paper industry, inline process refractometers are used in the energy recovery from black liquor recovery boilers by accurately measuring solids in the black liquor. In the food and beverage industry, inline process refractometers are used to measure dissolved solids, most often as sugar content, measured in degrees Brix. In the pharmaceutical industry they are used to monitor and control concentration levels during supersaturation, a critical process in crystallization. In the chemical industry they are used in Hydrochloric Acid applications, Sulphuric Acid applications, and boiler cleaning chemicals processes.
