= Tauc–Lorentz model =

Mathematical formula

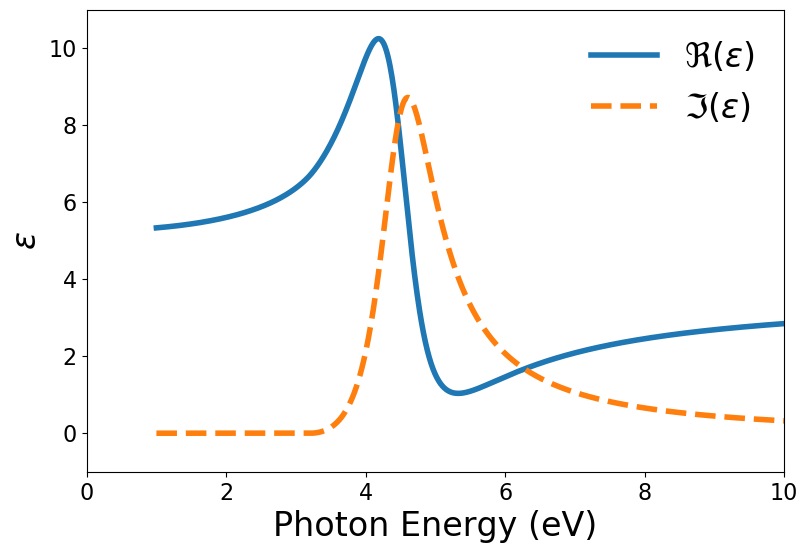
Tauc-Lorentz model. The real (blue solid line) and imaginary (orange dashed line) components of relative permittivity are plotted for model with parameters $E_{g} =$ 3.2 eV, $E_{0} =$ 4.5 eV, $A =$ 100 eV, $C =$ 1 eV, and $\varepsilon_{\infty} =$ 3.5.

The Tauc–Lorentz model is a mathematical formula for the frequency dependence of the complex-valued relative permittivity, sometimes referred to as the dielectric function. The model has been used to fit the complex refractive index of amorphous semiconductor materials at frequencies greater than their optical band gap. The dispersion relation bears the names of Jan Tauc and Hendrik Lorentz, whose previous works were combined by G. E. Jellison and F. A. Modine to create the model. The model was inspired, in part, by shortcomings of the Forouhi–Bloomer model, which is aphysical due to its incorrect asymptotic behavior and non-Hermitian character. Despite the inspiration, the Tauc–Lorentz model is itself aphysical due to being non-Hermitian and non-analytic in the upper half-plane. Further researchers have modified the model to address these shortcomings.

== Mathematical formulation ==
The general form of the model is given by

$$\varepsilon(E) = \varepsilon_{\infty} + \chi^{TL}(E)$$

where

- $\varepsilon$ is the relative permittivity,
- $E$ is the photon energy (related to the angular frequency by $E=\hbar\omega$),
- $\varepsilon_{\infty}$ is the value of the relative permittivity at infinite energy,
- $\chi^{TL}$ is related to the electric susceptibility.

The imaginary component of $\chi^{TL}(E)$ is formed as the product of the imaginary component of the Lorentz oscillator model and a model developed by Jan Tauc for the imaginary component of the relative permittivity near the bandgap of a material. The real component of $\chi^{TL}(E)$ is obtained via the Kramers-Kronig transform of its imaginary component. Mathematically, they are given by

$$\Im\left( \chi^{TL}(E) \right) = \begin{cases} \frac{1}{E} \frac{A E_{0} C (E - E_{g})^{2}}{(E^{2} - E_{0}^{2})^{2} + C^{2} E^{2}}, & \text{if } E > E_{g} \\ 0, & \text{if } E \le E_{g} \end{cases}$$
$$\Re\left( \chi^{TL}(E) \right) = \frac{2}{\pi} \int_{E_{g}}^{\infty} \frac{\xi \Im\left( \chi^{TL}(\xi) \right)}{\xi^{2} - E^{2}} d\xi$$

where

- $A$ is a fitting parameter related to the strength of the Lorentzian oscillator,
- $C$ is a fitting parameter related to the broadening of the Lorentzian oscillator,
- $E_{0}$ is a fitting parameter related to the resonant frequency of the Lorentzian oscillator,
- $E_{g}$ is a fitting parameter related to the bandgap of the material.

Computing the Kramers-Kronig transform,

$$\Re\left( \chi^{TL}(E) \right) \,\!$$

$= \frac{A C}{\pi \zeta^{4}} \frac{a_{\mathrm{ln}}}{2 \alpha E_{0}} \ln{\left( \frac{E_{0}^{2} + E_{g}^{2} + \alpha E_{g}}{E_{0}^{2} + E_{g}^{2} - \alpha E_{g}} \right)} \,\!$ $- \frac{A}{\pi \zeta^{4}} \frac{a_{\mathrm{atan}}}{E_{0}} \left[ \pi - \arctan{\left( \frac{\alpha + 2 E_{g}}{C} \right)} + \arctan{\left( \frac{\alpha - 2 E_{g}}{C} \right)} \right] \,\!$ $+ 2 \frac{A E_{0}}{\pi \zeta^{4} \alpha} E_{g} \left( E^{2} - \gamma^{2} \right) \left[ \pi + 2 \arctan{\left( 2 \frac{\gamma^{2} - E_{g}^{2}}{\alpha C} \right)} \right] \,\!$ $- \frac{A E_{0} C}{\pi \zeta^{4}} \frac{E^{2} + E_{g}^{2}}{E} \ln{\left( \frac{\left| E - E_{g} \right|}{E+E_{g}} \right)} \,\!$ $+ 2 \frac{A E_{0} C}{\pi \zeta^{4}} E_{g} \ln{\left[ \frac{\left| E - E_{g}\right| \left( E + E_{g} \right)}{\sqrt{\left( E_{0}^{2} - E_{g}^{2} \right)^{2} + E_{g}^{2} C^{2} }} \right]}$

where

- $a_{\mathrm{ln}} = \left( E_{g}^{2} - E_{0}^{2} \right) E^{2} + E_{g}^{2} C^{2} - E_{0}^{2} \left( E_{0}^{2} + 3 E_{g}^{2} \right)$,
- $a_{\mathrm{atan}} = \left( E^{2} - E_{0}^{2} \right)\left( E_{0}^{2} + E_{g}^{2} \right) + E_{g}^{2} C^{2}$,
- $\alpha = \sqrt{4 E_{0}^{2} - C^{2}}$,
- $\gamma = \sqrt{E_{0}^{2} - C^{2}/2}$,
- $\zeta^{4} = \left( E^{2} - \gamma^{2} \right)^{2} + \frac{\alpha^{2} C^{2}}{4}$.

== See also ==
- Cauchy equation
- Sellmeier equation
- Lorentz oscillator model
- Forouhi–Bloomer model
- Brendel–Bormann oscillator model
