= Forouhi–Bloomer model =

Popular optical dispersion relation

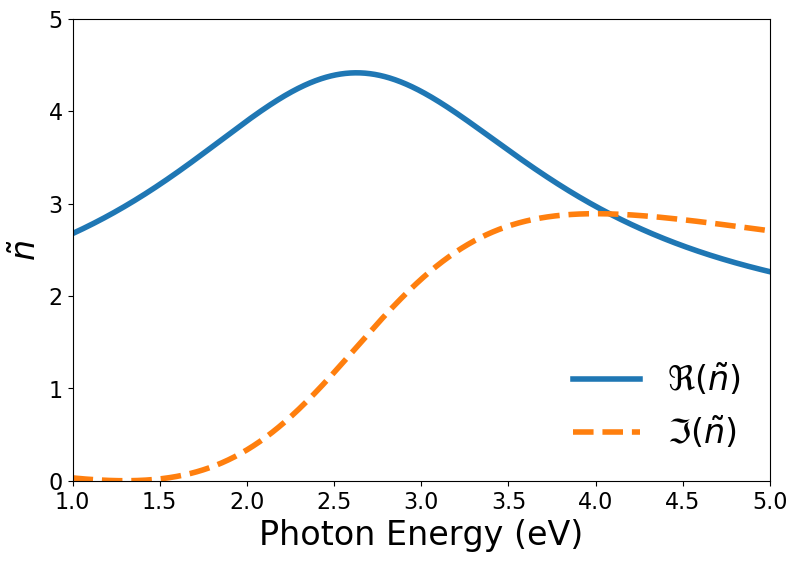
Forouhi–Bloomer model. The real (blue solid line) and imaginary (orange dashed line) components of complex refractive index are plotted for model with parameters $E_{g} =$ 1.3 eV, $A =$ 1.4910 eV, $B =$ 5.2139 eV, $C =$ 8.6170 eV$^{2}$, and $n_{\infty} =$ 1.5256. These parameters approximate amorphous silicon.

The Forouhi–Bloomer model is a mathematical formula for the frequency dependence of the complex-valued refractive index. The model can be used to fit the refractive index of amorphous and crystalline semiconductor and dielectric materials at energies near and greater than their optical band gap. The dispersion relation bears the names of Rahim Forouhi and Iris Bloomer, who created the model and interpreted the physical significance of its parameters. The model is aphysical due to its incorrect asymptotic behavior and non-Hermitian character. These shortcomings inspired modified versions of the model as well as development of the Tauc–Lorentz model.

== Mathematical formulation ==
The complex refractive index is given by

$$\tilde{n}(E) = n(E) + i \kappa(E)$$

where

- $n$ is the real component of the complex refractive index, commonly called the refractive index,
- $\kappa$ is the imaginary component of the complex refractive index, commonly called the extinction coefficient,
- $E$ is the photon energy (related to the angular frequency by $E=\hbar\omega$).

The real and imaginary components of the refractive index are related to one another through the Kramers-Kronig relations. Forouhi and Bloomer derived a formula for $\kappa(E)$ for amorphous materials. The formula and complementary Kramers–Kronig integral are given by

$$\kappa(E) = \frac{A \left( E - E_{g} \right)^{2}}{E^{2} - B E + C}$$
$$n(E) = n_{\infty} + \frac{1}{\pi} \mathcal{P} \int_{-\infty}^{\infty} \frac{\kappa(\xi) - \kappa_{\infty}}{\xi - E} d\xi$$

where

- $E_{g}$ is the bandgap of the material,
- $A$, $B$, $C$, and $n_{\infty}$ are fitting parameters,
- $\mathcal{P}$ denotes the Cauchy principal value,
- $\kappa_{\infty} = \lim_{E \rightarrow \infty} \kappa(E) = A$.

$A$, $B$, and $C$ are subject to the constraints $A>0$, $B>0$, $C>0$, and $4C - B^{2} > 0$. Evaluating the Kramers-Kronig integral,

$$n(E) = n_{\infty} + \frac{B_{0} E + C_{0}}{E^{2} - B E + C}$$

where

- $Q = \frac{1}{2} \sqrt{4 C - B^{2}}$,
- $B_{0} = \frac{A}{Q} \left( - \frac{1}{2} B^{2} + E_{g} B - E_{g}^{2} + C \right)$,
- $C_{0} = \frac{A}{Q} \left( \frac{1}{2} B \left( E_{g}^{2} + C \right) - 2 E_{g} C \right)$.

The Forouhi–Bloomer model for crystalline materials is similar to that of amorphous materials. The formulas for $n(E)$ and $\kappa(E)$ are given by

$$n(E) = n_{\infty} + \sum_{j} \frac{B_{0,j} E + C_{0,j}}{E^{2} - B_{j} E + C_{j}}$$.
$$\kappa(E) = \left( E - E_{g} \right)^{2} \sum_{j} \frac{A_{j}}{E^{2} - B_{j} E + C_{j}}$$.

where all variables are defined similarly to the amorphous case, but with unique values for each value of the summation index $j$. Thus, the model for amorphous materials is a special case of the model for crystalline materials when the sum is over a single term only.

== See also ==
- Cauchy equation
- Sellmeier equation
- Lorentz oscillator model
- Tauc–Lorentz model
- Brendel–Bormann oscillator model
