= Lorentz oscillator model =

Theoretical model describing the optical response of bound charges

Electrons are bound to the atomic nucleus analogously to springs.

The Lorentz oscillator model (classical electron oscillator or CEO model) describes the optical response of bound charges. The model is named after the Dutch physicist Hendrik Lorentz who proposed it in 1878. It is a classical, phenomenological model for materials with characteristic resonance frequencies (or other characteristic energy scales) for optical absorption, e.g. ionic and molecular vibrations, interband transitions (semiconductors), phonons, and collective excitations.

== Derivation ==
=== Electron motion ===
The model is derived by modeling an electron orbiting a massive, stationary nucleus as a spring-mass-damper system. The electron is modeled to be connected to the nucleus via a hypothetical spring and its motion is damped by via a hypothetical damper. The damping force ensures that the oscillator's response is finite at its resonance frequency. For a time-harmonic driving force which originates from the electric field, Newton's second law can be applied to the electron to obtain the motion of the electron and expressions for the dipole moment, polarization, susceptibility, and dielectric function.

The equation of motion for the electron oscillator is
$$\begin{align}
\mathbf F_\text{net} =\mathbf F_\text{damping} + \mathbf F_\text{spring} + \mathbf F_\text{driving} &= m\frac{\mathrm d^2 \mathbf r}{\mathrm dt^2} \\[1ex]
\frac{ -m}{ \tau} \frac{\mathrm d\mathbf r}{\mathrm dt} - k \mathbf r - {e} \mathbf E(t) &= m\frac{\mathrm d^2 \mathbf r}{\mathrm dt^2} \\[1ex]
\frac{\mathrm d^2 \mathbf r}{\mathrm dt^2} + \frac{ 1}{ \tau} \frac{\mathrm d\mathbf r}{\mathrm dt} + \omega_0^2 \mathbf r\; &= \; \frac{-e}{m}  \mathbf E(t),
\end{align}$$

where

- $\mathbf r$ is the displacement of charge from the rest position,
- $t$ is time,
- $\tau$ is the relaxation time/scattering time,
- $k$ is a constant factor characteristic of the spring,
- $m$ is the effective mass of the electron,
- $\omega_0 = \sqrt{k / m }$ is the resonance frequency of the oscillator,
- $e$ is the elementary charge,
- $\mathbf E(t)$ is the electric field.

For time-harmonic fields
$$\mathbf E(t) = \mathbf E_0 e^{- i \omega t},$$
$$\mathbf r(t) = \mathbf r_0 e^{- i \omega t},$$

the stationary solution of this equation of motion is
$$\mathbf r(\omega) = \frac{-e}{m} \frac{1} {\omega_0^2 - \omega^2 - i \omega/\tau} \mathbf E(\omega).$$

The fact that the above solution is complex means there is a time delay (phase shift) between the driving electric field and the response of the electron's motion.

=== Dipole moment ===
The displacement, $\mathbf r$, induces a dipole moment, $\mathbf p$, given by
$$\mathbf p(\omega) = -e \mathbf r(\omega) = \hat\alpha(\omega)  \mathbf E(\omega) .$$

Here, $\hat \alpha(\omega)$ is the polarizability of single oscillator, given by
$$\hat \alpha(\omega) =  \frac{e^2}{m} \frac{1}{(\omega_0^2 - \omega^2) - i \omega/\tau} .$$

Three distinct scattering regimes can be interpreted corresponding to the dominant denominator term in the dipole moment:

Regime	Condition	Dispersion Scaling	Phase Shift
Thomson scattering	$\omega^2 \gg \frac{\omega}{\tau}, \omega_0^2$	$1$	0°
Shneider–Miles scattering	$\frac{\omega}{\tau}\gg|\omega_0^2-\omega^2|$	$\omega^2$	90°
Rayleigh scattering	$\omega_0^2\gg \omega^2 ,\frac{\omega}{\tau}$	$\omega^4$	180°

=== Polarization and electric displacement ===
The polarization $\mathbf P$ is the dipole moment per unit volume. For macroscopic material properties $N$ is the density of charges (electrons) per unit volume. Considering that each electron is acting with the same dipole moment we have the polarization as
$$\mathbf P = N \mathbf p = N \hat \alpha(\omega) \mathbf E(\omega) .$$

The electric displacement $\mathbf D$ is related to the polarization density $\mathbf P$ by
$$\mathbf D = \hat\varepsilon \mathbf E = \mathbf E + 4\pi \mathbf P = (1 + 4\pi N \hat \alpha) \mathbf E.$$

== Dielectric function ==
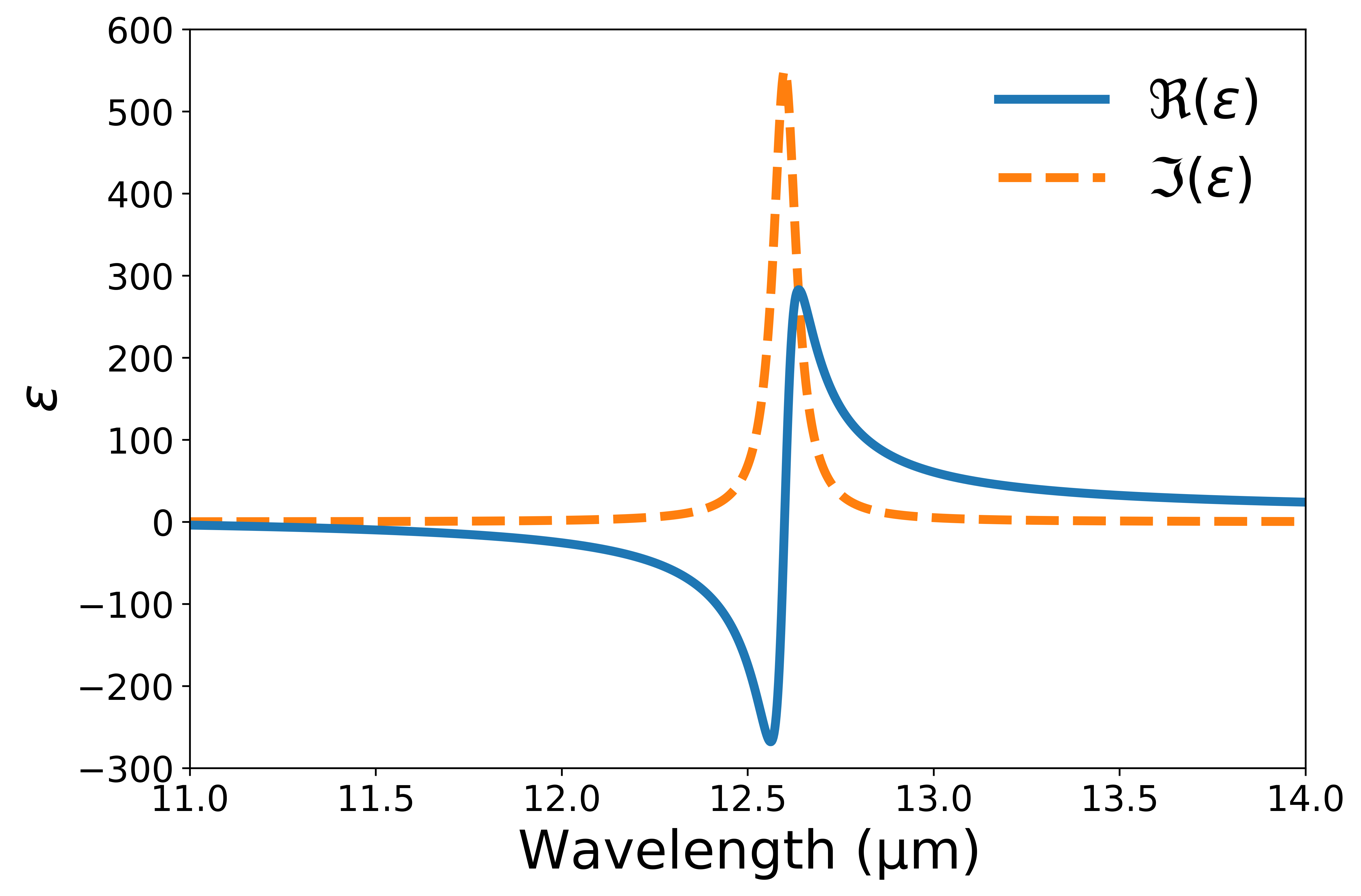
Lorentz oscillator model. The real (blue solid line) and imaginary (orange dashed line) components of relative permittivity are plotted for a single oscillator model with parameters $\omega_0 = \mathrm{23.8\,THz}$ (12.6 μm), $s/\omega_0^2 = \mathrm{3.305}$, $\Gamma/\omega_0 = \mathrm{0.006}$, and $\varepsilon_{\infty} = \mathrm{6.7}$. These parameters approximate hexagonal silicon carbide.

The complex dielectric function is (in Gaussian units):
$$\hat \varepsilon(\omega) = 1 + \frac{4\pi N e^2}{m} \frac{1}{(\omega_0^2 - \omega^2) - i \omega/\tau},$$
where one can define $\omega_p^2 \equiv \frac{4\pi N e^2}{m}$, which is the square of the so-called plasma frequency.

In practice, the model is commonly modified to account for multiple absorption mechanisms present in a medium. This modified version is given by
$$\hat \varepsilon(\omega) = \varepsilon_{\infty} + \sum_{j} \chi_{j}^{L}(\omega; \omega_{0,j}),$$
where
$$\chi_{j}^{L}(\omega; \omega_{0,j}) = \frac{s_j}{\omega_{0,j}^2 - \omega^2 - i \Gamma_j \omega},$$
and

- $\varepsilon_{\infty}$ is the value of the dielectric function at infinite frequency, which can be used as an adjustable parameter to account for high frequency absorption mechanisms;
- $s_{j} = \omega_p^{2} f_{j}$ and $f_{j}$ is related to the strength of the $j$th absorption mechanism;
- $\Gamma_{j} = 1/\tau$.

Separating the real and imaginary components,
$$\hat \varepsilon(\omega)
= \varepsilon_1(\omega) + i \varepsilon_2(\omega)
= \left[ \varepsilon_{\infty} + \sum_{j} \frac{s_{j} (\omega_{0,j}^2 - \omega^2)}{\left(\omega_{0,j}^{2} - \omega^{2}\right)^{2} + \left(\Gamma_{j} \omega\right)^2} \right]
+ i \left[ \sum_{j} \frac{s_{j} (\Gamma_{j} \omega)}{\left(\omega_{0,j}^{2} - \omega^{2}\right)^{2} + \left(\Gamma_{j} \omega\right)^{2}} \right].$$

== Complex conductivity ==
The complex optical conductivity in general is related to the complex dielectric function (in Gaussian units) as
$$\hat \sigma(\omega) = \frac{\omega}{4\pi i} \left(\hat\varepsilon(\omega) - 1\right).$$

Substituting the formula of $\hat\varepsilon(\omega)$ in the equation above we obtain
$$\hat \sigma(\omega) =  \frac{N e^2}{m} \frac{\omega}{\omega/\tau + i \left(\omega_0^2 - \omega^2 \right)} .$$

Separating the real and imaginary components gives
$$\hat \sigma(\omega) =  \sigma_1(\omega) + i \sigma_2(\omega) =
\frac{N e^2}{m} \frac{\frac{\omega^2}{\tau}}{\left(\omega_0^2 - \omega^2\right)^2 + \omega^2 / \tau^2 } - i \frac{N e^2}{m} \frac{\left(\omega_0^2 - \omega^2\right) \omega}{\left(\omega_0^2 - \omega^2\right)^2 + \omega^2/\tau^2}.$$

== Zeeman effect ==
Soon after Zeeman's discovery of the Zeeman effect, Lorentz used the oscillator model to give a theoretical explanation of it. He added a term corresponding to the Lorentz force to the equation, which couples the equations of motions in the x- and y-directions (assuming a magnetic field in the z-direction). In Gaussian units, this gives

$$m\frac{d^2x}{dt^2}=-kx+\frac{eH}{c}\frac{dy}{dt}$$
$$m\frac{d^2y}{dt^2}=-ky+\frac{eH}{c}\frac{dx}{dt}.$$

Solving these equations gives two different solutions, depending on whether the electron moves clockwise or counterclockwise. These solutions have different frequencies:

$$\omega_1^2-\frac{eH}{mc}\omega_1=\omega_0^2$$
$$\omega_2^2-\frac{eH}{mc}\omega_2=\omega_0^2.$$

In the case of a small magnetic field, this gives a small frequency difference that is linearly proportional to the magnetic field:

$$\Delta \omega = \frac{eH}{2mc}.$$

Thus, a spectral line is indeed split by a magnetic field, in qualitative correspondence to Zeeman's discovery.

== See also ==
- Cauchy equation
- Sellmeier equation
- Forouhi–Bloomer model
- Tauc–Lorentz model
- Brendel–Bormann oscillator model
