= Jan Tauc =

Czech-American physicist

- Born: 15 April 1922; Pardubice, Czechoslovakia
- Died: 28 December 2010 (aged 88); Washougal, Washington, United States
- Education: Czech Technical University in Prague
- Known for: Tauc plot Tauc–Lorentz model
- Awards: Frank Isakson Prize for Optical Effects in Solids (1982); David Adler Lectureship Award (1988)
- Scientific career
- Fields: Semiconductor physics
- Workplaces: Czech Technical University in Prague (1952–1969); Charles University in Prague (1964–1969); Bell Labs (1969–1970); Brown University (1970–1992)

Jan Tauc (/taʊts/; 15 April 1922 – 28 December 2010) was a Czech-American physicist who introduced the concepts of Tauc gap and Tauc plot to the optical characterization of solids. Born in Bohemia, he emigrated to the United States in 1969, where he received citizenship in 1978, and worked for the rest of his life.

== Biography ==
Tauc was born in Pardubice, Bohemia (now in the Czech Republic). Ten year later, his father, a post-office accountant, was transferred to Opava. In 1938, the region was annexed by Germany, and all Czech citizens were expelled within hours. The Tauc family eventually settled in Brno, where Jan graduated from a high school. He spent one of his high school years in Nîmes, France, on a three-year scholarship that was interrupted by World War II. During the war, Tauc attended a technical school while working at a weapons factory and studying physics independently. Within a few years after the war he obtained a university degree in electrical engineering. In 1949 he defended a PhD on dielectric antennas at the Czech Technical University in Prague. He then became interested in semiconductor physics and built the first point-contact transistor in Czechoslovakia. In 1952 he became the head of the semiconductor department at the Institute of Technical Physics of the newly established Czechoslovak Academy of Sciences. In 1956 he defended his habilitation on electromotive forces in semiconductors, and between 1964 and 1969 worked as professor of experimental physics at the Charles University in Prague. While attending the fourth International Conference on the Physics of Semiconductors in Rochester, New York, he convinced the organizers to choose Prague for the next meeting in 1960, in which he acted as a local chair. This was the first such event in a Soviet bloc country.

While Tauc's early work mainly concerned photovoltaic, thermoelectric and optical properties of crystalline semiconductors, in the mid-1960s he focused on amorphous semiconductors, in particular hydrogenated silicon, which became his major research topic until retirement. In 1966 he published an article on the electronic and optical properties of amorphous germanium that laid the foundation for semi-empirical studies of amorphous materials and introduced the concepts of the Tauc gap and the Tauc plot.

In early 1969, soon after the Soviet invasion of Czechoslovakia, Tauc left the country. After spending a few months at the University of Paris he moved with his family to Bell Labs in Murray Hill, New Jersey, United States, for a 12-month fellowship. He remained a long-term consultant for Bell Labs after that. In October 1969, when the Czech Academy of Sciences annulled his sabbatical leave and requested his return, Tauc refused and accepted a position of professor of engineering and physics at the Brown University, Rhode Island, which he held until his retirement in 1992. Because of this decision he received a jail sentence in Czechoslovakia that prevented him from visiting the country for decades into the future. At Brown University, he co-authored a patent for a method of characterizing thin films using transient photomodulation spectroscopy. He also wrote several books, served as an editor of three journals, and was a member of the United States National Academy of Sciences. His awards included the 1982 Frank Isakson Prize and the 1988 David Adler Lectureship Award of the American Physical Society. In 2003, long after the fall of the Communist regime, he received the De Scientia et Humanitate Optime Meritis medal, the highest award for a scientist in Czech Republic.

In 1947, Tauc married Vera Koubelova, who died in 2008. They had a daughter, Elena (born 1951), and a son, Jan (born 1954). His younger brother Ladislav Tauc (1926–1999) was a famous neuroscientist, a pioneer in neuroethology and neuronal physiology. Ladislav immigrated to France in 1949 and became a French citizen, whereas Jan received American citizenship in 1978. Jan was a long-term friend and colleague of Manuel Cardona, who, among other things, persuaded him to accept the position at Brown University in 1970.

== Books ==
- Jan Tauc (1962). Photo and thermoelectric effects in semiconductors. Pergamon Press.
- Jan Tauc (1974). Amorphous and liquid semiconductors. Plenum. ISBN 978-0-306-30777-5.
- Phillip J. Stiles; Jan Tauc (1976). Optical Studies of Bonding in Solids. Defense Technical Information Center.
- Jan Tauc (1980). Electronic Structure and Stability of Metallic Glasses. Defense Technical Information Center.
