= Tauc plot =

Method for determining the band gap of a material

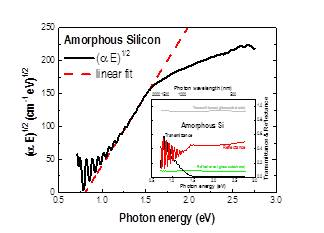
Tauc representation illustrating the optical bandgap (E_{Tauc}~ 0.8 eV) of a film of amorphous Si. The insert shows their corresponding transmittance/reflectance spectra.

A Tauc plot is used to determine the optical bandgap, or Tauc bandgap, of either disordered or amorphous semiconductors.

In his original work Jan Tauc (/taʊts/) showed that the optical absorption spectrum of amorphous germanium resembles the spectrum of the indirect transitions in crystalline germanium (plus a tail due to localized states at lower energies), and proposed an extrapolation to find the optical bandgap of these crystalline-like states. Typically, a Tauc plot shows the photon energy E (= hν) on the abscissa (x-coordinate) and the quantity (αE)^{1/2} on the ordinate (y-coordinate), where α is the absorption coefficient of the material. Thus, extrapolating this linear region to the abscissa yields the energy of the optical bandgap of the amorphous material.

A similar procedure is adopted to determine the optical bandgap of crystalline semiconductors. It can be shown that (αE)^{2} is linear in E for direct, allowed transitions. For photon energies sufficiently near the gap this reduces to α^{2} being linear with E. In general, the ordinate is approximately given by (α)^{1/r}, in which the exponent ^{1/r} denotes the nature of the transition:^{,}^{,}

- r = 1/2 for direct allowed transitions
- r = 3/2 for direct forbidden transitions.
- r = 2 for indirect allowed transitions
- r = 3 for indirect forbidden transitions

== See also ==
- Band gap
- Urbach energy
- Kubelka–Munk theory
