= Hermitian function =

Type of complex function

In mathematical analysis, a Hermitian function is a complex function with the property that its complex conjugate is equal to the original function with the variable changed in sign:

$$f^*(x) = f(-x)$$

(where the $^*$ indicates the complex conjugate) for all $x$ in the domain of $f$. In physics, this property is referred to as PT symmetry.

This definition extends also to functions of two or more variables, e.g., in the case that $f$ is a function of two variables it is Hermitian if
$$f^*(x_1, x_2) = f(-x_1, -x_2)$$
for all pairs $(x_1, x_2)$ in the domain of $f$.

From this definition it follows immediately that: $f$ is a Hermitian function if and only if

- the real part of $f$ is an even function,
- the imaginary part of $f$ is an odd function.

== Motivation ==
Hermitian functions appear frequently in mathematics, physics, and signal processing. For example, the following two statements follow from basic properties of the Fourier transform:

- The function $f$ is real-valued if and only if the Fourier transform of $f$ is Hermitian.
- The function $f$ is Hermitian if and only if the Fourier transform of $f$ is real-valued.

Since the Fourier transform of a real signal is guaranteed to be Hermitian, it can be compressed using the Hermitian even/odd symmetry. This, for example, allows the discrete Fourier transform of a signal (which is in general complex) to be stored in the same space as the original real signal. Informally, only half of the fourier transform of a real signal is needed to lossessly represent it in frequency domain.

For the magnitude spectra (obtained from DFT), the axis of symmetry is around the Nyquist point; one half is the mirror image of the other.

- If f is Hermitian, then $f \star g = f*g$.

Where the $\star$ is cross-correlation, and $*$ is convolution.

- If both f and g are Hermitian, then $f \star g = g \star f$.

== See also ==
- Complex conjugate – Fundamental operation on complex numbers
- Even and odd functions – Functions such that f(–x) equals f(x) or –f(x)
