= Sellmeier equation =

Empirical relationship between refractive index and wavelength

Refractive index vs. wavelength for BK7 glass, showing measured points (blue crosses) and the Sellmeier equation (red line)

Same as the graph above, but with Cauchy's equation (blue line) for comparison. While Cauchy's equation (blue line) deviates significantly from the measured refractive indices outside of the visible region (which is shaded red), the Sellmeier equation (green dashed line) does not.

The Sellmeier equation is an empirical relationship between refractive index and wavelength for a particular transparent medium. The equation is used to determine the dispersion of light in the medium.

It was first proposed in 1872 by Wolfgang Sellmeier and was a development of the work of Augustin Cauchy on Cauchy's equation for modelling dispersion.

== Description ==
In its original and the most general form, the Sellmeier equation is given as

$$n^2(\lambda) = 1 + \sum_i \frac{B_i \lambda^2}{\lambda^2 - C_i}$$,

where n is the refractive index, λ is the wavelength, and B_{i} and C_{i} are experimentally determined Sellmeier coefficients. These coefficients are usually quoted for λ in micrometres. Note that this λ is the vacuum wavelength, not that in the material itself, which is λ/n. A different form of the equation is sometimes used for certain types of materials, e.g. crystals.

Each term of the sum represents an absorption resonance of strength B_{i} at a wavelength √C_{i}. For example, the coefficients for BK7 below correspond to two absorption resonances in the ultraviolet, and one in the mid-infrared region. Analytically, this process is based on approximating the underlying optical resonances as dirac delta functions, followed by the application of the Kramers-Kronig relations. This results in real and imaginary parts of the refractive index which are physically sensible. However, close to each absorption peak, the equation gives non-physical values of n^{2} = ±∞, and in these wavelength regions a more precise model of dispersion such as the Lorentz oscillator model must be used.

If all terms are specified for a material, at long wavelengths far from the absorption peaks the value of n tends to

$$n \approx \sqrt{1 + \sum_i  B_i } \approx \sqrt{\varepsilon_r}$$

where ε_{r} is the relative permittivity of the medium.

For characterization of glasses the equation consisting of three terms is commonly used:

$$n^2(\lambda) = 1
+ \frac{B_1 \lambda^2 }{ \lambda^2 - C_1}
+ \frac{B_2 \lambda^2 }{ \lambda^2 - C_2}
+ \frac{B_3 \lambda^2 }{ \lambda^2 - C_3},$$

As an example, the coefficients for a common borosilicate crown glass known as BK7 are shown below:

Coefficient	Value
B_{1}	1.03961212
B_{2}	0.231792344
B_{3}	1.01046945
C_{1}	6.00069867×10^{−3} μm^{2}
C_{2}	2.00179144×10^{−2} μm^{2}
C_{3}	1.03560653×10^{2} μm^{2}

For common optical glasses, the refractive index calculated with the three-term Sellmeier equation deviates from the actual refractive index by less than 5×10^{−6} over the wavelengths' range of 365 nm to 2.3 μm, which is of the order of the homogeneity of a glass sample. Additional terms are sometimes added to make the calculation even more precise.

Sometimes the Sellmeier equation is used in two-term form:

$$n^2(\lambda) = A + \frac{B_1\lambda^2}{\lambda^2 - C_1} + \frac{ B_2 \lambda^2}{\lambda^2 - C_2}.$$

Here the coefficient A is an approximation of the short-wavelength (e.g., ultraviolet) absorption contributions to the refractive index at longer wavelengths. Other variants of the Sellmeier equation exist that can account for a material's refractive index change due to temperature, pressure, and other parameters.

== Derivation ==
Originally, Sellmeier derived his equation by modelling the interaction of light and matter by assuming that particles in matter vibrate harmonically in response to light waves. (Note: For a similar derivation, see the Lorentz oscillator model) Below, a different derivation based on the Kramers–Kronig relations is given.

Analytically, the Sellmeier equation models the refractive index as due to a series of optical resonances within the bulk material. Its derivation from the Kramers–Kronig relations requires a few assumptions about the material, from which any deviations will affect the model's accuracy:

- There exists a number of resonances, and the final refractive index can be calculated from the sum over the contributions from all resonances.
- All optical resonances are at wavelengths far away from the wavelengths of interest, where the model is applied.
- At these resonant frequencies, the imaginary component of the susceptibility ($\chi_\Im$) can be modeled as a delta function.

From the last point, the complex refractive index (and the electric susceptibility) becomes:

$$\chi_\Im(\omega) = \sum_l A_l\, \delta(\omega-\omega_l)$$

The real part of the refractive index comes from applying the Kramers-Kronig relations to the imaginary part:

$$n^2(\omega) = 1 + \chi_\Re(\omega) = 1 + \frac{2}{\pi}\int_0^\infty \frac{\omega^\prime\, \chi_\Im(\omega^\prime)}{{\omega^\prime}^2 - \omega^2}\,\mathrm{d}\omega^\prime$$

Plugging in the first equation above for the imaginary component:

$$n^2(\omega) = 1 + \frac{2}{\pi}\int_0^\infty \frac{\displaystyle \omega^\prime\,\sum_l A_l\, \delta(\omega^\prime-\omega_l)}{{\omega^\prime}^2 - \omega ^2}\,\mathrm{d}\omega^\prime$$

The order of summation and integration can be swapped. When evaluated, this gives the following, where $H$ is the Heaviside function:

$$n^2(\omega) = 1 + \frac{2}{\pi} \sum_l A_l\,\int_0^\infty \frac{\omega^\prime}{{\omega^\prime}^2 - \omega ^2}\delta(\omega^\prime-\omega_l)\,\mathrm{d}\omega^\prime = 1 + \frac{2}{\pi} \sum_l A_l \frac{\omega_l H(\omega_l)}{\omega_l^2-\omega^2}$$

Since the domain is assumed to be far from any resonances (assumption 2 above), $H(\omega_l)$ evaluates to 1 and a familiar form of the Sellmeier equation is obtained:

$$n^2(\omega) = 1 + \frac{2}{\pi} \sum_l A_l \frac{\omega_l}{\omega_l^2-\omega^2}$$

By rearranging terms, the constants $B_i$ and $C_i$ can be substituted into the equation above to give the Sellmeier equation.

== Coefficients ==
Table of coefficients of Sellmeier equation
Material	B_{1}	B_{2}	B_{3}	C_{1}, μm^{2}	C_{2}, μm^{2}	C_{3}, μm^{2}
borosilicate crown glass (known as BK7)	1.03961212	0.231792344	1.01046945	6.00069867×10^{−3}	2.00179144×10^{−2}	103.560653
sapphire (for ordinary wave)	1.43134930	0.65054713	5.3414021	5.2799261×10^{−3}	1.42382647×10^{−2}	325.017834
sapphire (for extraordinary wave)	1.5039759	0.55069141	6.5927379	5.48041129×10^{−3}	1.47994281×10^{−2}	402.89514
fused silica	0.6961663	0.4079426	0.8974794	0.004679148	0.01351206	97.934
Magnesium fluoride	0.48755108	0.39875031	2.3120353	0.001882178	0.008951888	566.13559

== See also ==
- Cauchy's equation
- Lorentz oscillator model
