= Cauchy's equation =

Relationship between refractive index and wavelength

Refractive index vs. wavelength for BK7 glass. Red crosses show measured values. Over the visible region (red shading), Cauchy's equation (blue line) agrees well with the measured refractive indices and the Sellmeier plot (green dashed line). It deviates in the ultraviolet and infrared regions.

In optics, Cauchy's transmission equation is an empirical relationship between the refractive index and wavelength of light for a particular transparent material. It is named for the mathematician Augustin-Louis Cauchy, who originally defined it in 1830 in his article "The refraction and reflection of light".

== Formulation ==
The most general form of Cauchy's equation is

$$n(\lambda) = A + \frac {B}{\lambda^2} + \frac{C}{\lambda^4} + \cdots,$$

where n is the refractive index, λ is the wavelength, A, B, C, etc., are coefficients that can be determined for a material by fitting the equation to measured refractive indices at known wavelengths. The coefficients are usually quoted for λ as the vacuum wavelength in micrometres.

Usually, it is sufficient to use a two-term form of the equation:

$$n(\lambda) = A + \frac{B}{\lambda^2},$$

where the coefficients A and B are determined specifically for this form of the equation.

A table of coefficients for common optical materials is shown below:

Material	A	B (μm^{2})
Fused silica	1.4580	0.00354
Borosilicate glass BK7	1.5046	0.00420
Hard crown glass K5	1.5220	0.00459
Barium crown glass BaK4	1.5690	0.00531
Barium flint glass BaF10	1.6700	0.00743
Dense flint glass SF10	1.7280	0.01342

The theory of light–matter interaction on which Cauchy based this equation was later found to be incorrect. In particular, the equation is only valid for regions of normal dispersion in the visible wavelength region. In the infrared, the equation becomes inaccurate, and it cannot represent regions of anomalous dispersion. Despite this, its mathematical simplicity makes it useful in some applications.

The Sellmeier equation is a later development of Cauchy's work that handles anomalously dispersive regions, and more accurately models a material's refractive index across the ultraviolet, visible, and infrared spectrum.

== Humidity dependence for air ==
Cauchy's two-term equation for air, expanded by Lorentz to account for humidity, is as follows:

$$n_{air}(\lambda, T, v, p) \approx 1 + \frac{77.6 \cdot 10^{-6}}{T} \left(1+ \frac{7.52 \cdot 10^{-3}}{\lambda^2} \right)\left(p + 4810 \frac{v}{T}\right),$$

where p is the air pressure in millibar, T is the temperature in kelvin, and v is the vapor pressure of water in millibar.

== See also ==
- Sellmeier equation
