= Axial multipole moments =

Axial multipole moments are a series expansion of the electric potential of a charge distribution localized close to the origin along one Cartesian axis, denoted here as the z-axis. However, the axial multipole expansion can also be applied to any potential or field that varies inversely with the distance to the source, i.e., as $\frac{1}{R}$. For clarity, we first illustrate the expansion for a single point charge, then generalize to an arbitrary charge density $\lambda(z)$ localized to the z-axis.

Figure 1: Point charge on the z axis; Definitions for axial multipole expansion

== Axial multipole moments of a point charge ==
The electric potential of a point charge q located on the z-axis at $z=a$ (Fig. 1) equals $\Phi(\mathbf{r}) = \frac{q}{4\pi\varepsilon} \frac{1}{R} = \frac{q}{4\pi\varepsilon} \frac{1}{\sqrt{r^{2} + a^{2} - 2 a r \cos \theta}}.$

If the radius r of the observation point is greater than a, we may factor out $\frac{1}{r}$ and expand the square root in powers of $(a/r)<1$ using Legendre polynomials $\Phi(\mathbf{r}) = \frac{q}{4\pi\varepsilon r} \sum_{k=0}^{\infty} \left( \frac{a}{r} \right)^{k} P_{k}(\cos \theta ) \equiv \frac{1}{4\pi\varepsilon} \sum_{k=0}^{\infty} M_{k} \left( \frac{1}{r^{k+1}} \right) P_{k}(\cos \theta )$ where the axial multipole moments $M_{k} \equiv q a^{k}$ contain everything specific to a given charge distribution; the other parts of the electric potential depend only on the coordinates of the observation point P. Special cases include the axial monopole moment $M_{0}=q$, the axial dipole moment $M_{1}=q a$ and the axial quadrupole moment $M_{2} \equiv q a^{2}$. This illustrates the general theorem that the lowest non-zero multipole moment is independent of the origin of the coordinate system, but higher multipole moments are not (in general).

Conversely, if the radius r is less than a, we may factor out $\frac{1}{a}$ and expand in powers of $(r/a)<1$, once again using Legendre polynomials $\Phi(\mathbf{r}) = \frac{q}{4\pi\varepsilon a} \sum_{k=0}^{\infty} \left( \frac{r}{a} \right)^{k} P_{k}(\cos \theta ) \equiv \frac{1}{4\pi\varepsilon} \sum_{k=0}^{\infty} I_{k} r^{k} P_{k}(\cos \theta )$ where the interior axial multipole moments $I_{k} \equiv \frac{q}{a^{k+1}}$ contain everything specific to a given charge distribution; the other parts depend only on the coordinates of the observation point P.

== General axial multipole moments ==
To get the general axial multipole moments, we replace the point charge of the previous section with an infinitesimal charge element $\lambda(\zeta)\ d\zeta$, where $\lambda(\zeta)$ represents the charge density at position $z=\zeta$ on the z-axis. If the radius r of the observation point P is greater than the largest $\left| \zeta \right|$ for which $\lambda(\zeta)$ is significant (denoted $\zeta_\text{max}$), the electric potential may be written $\Phi(\mathbf{r}) = \frac{1}{4\pi\varepsilon} \sum_{k=0}^{\infty} M_{k} \left( \frac{1}{r^{k+1}} \right) P_{k}(\cos \theta )$ where the axial multipole moments $M_{k}$ are defined $M_{k} \equiv \int d\zeta \ \lambda(\zeta) \zeta^{k}$

Special cases include the axial monopole moment (=total charge) $M_{0} \equiv \int d\zeta \ \lambda(\zeta),$ the axial dipole moment $M_{1} \equiv \int d\zeta \ \lambda(\zeta) \ \zeta$, and the axial quadrupole moment $M_{2} \equiv \int d\zeta \ \lambda(\zeta) \ \zeta^{2}$. Each successive term in the expansion varies inversely with a greater power of $r$, e.g., the monopole potential varies as $\frac{1}{r}$, the dipole potential varies as $\frac{1}{r^{2}}$, the quadrupole potential varies as $\frac{1}{r^{3}}$, etc. Thus, at large distances ($\frac{\zeta_\text{max}}{r} \ll 1$), the potential is well-approximated by the leading nonzero multipole term.

The lowest non-zero axial multipole moment is invariant under a shift b in origin, but higher moments generally depend on the choice of origin. The shifted multipole moments $M'_{k}$ would be $M_{k}^{\prime} \equiv \int d\zeta \ \lambda(\zeta) \ \left(\zeta + b \right)^{k}$

Expanding the polynomial under the integral $\left( \zeta + b \right)^{l} = \zeta^{l} + l b \zeta^{l-1} + \dots + l \zeta b^{l-1} + b^{l}$ leads to the equation $M_{k}^{\prime} = M_{k} + l b M_{k-1} + \dots + l b^{l-1} M_{1} + b^{l} M_{0}$ If the lower moments $M_{k-1}, M_{k-2},\ldots , M_{1}, M_{0}$ are zero, then $M_{k}^{\prime} = M_{k}$. The same equation shows that multipole moments higher than the first non-zero moment do depend on the choice of origin (in general).

== Interior axial multipole moments ==
Conversely, if the radius r is smaller than the smallest $\left| \zeta \right|$ for which $\lambda(\zeta)$ is significant (denoted $\zeta_\text{min}$), the electric potential may be written $\Phi(\mathbf{r}) = \frac{1}{4\pi\varepsilon} \sum_{k=0}^{\infty} I_{k} r^{k} P_{k}(\cos \theta )$ where the interior axial multipole moments $I_{k}$ are defined $I_{k} \equiv \int d\zeta \ \frac{\lambda(\zeta)}{\zeta^{k+1}}$

Special cases include the interior axial monopole moment ($\neq$ the total charge) $M_{0} \equiv \int d\zeta \ \frac{\lambda(\zeta)}{\zeta},$ the interior axial dipole moment $M_{1} \equiv \int d\zeta \ \frac{\lambda(\zeta)}{\zeta^{2}}$, etc. Each successive term in the expansion varies with a greater power of $r$, e.g., the interior monopole potential varies as $r$, the dipole potential varies as $r^{2}$, etc. At short distances ($\frac{r}{\zeta_\text{min}} \ll 1$), the potential is well-approximated by the leading nonzero interior multipole term.

== See also ==
- Potential theory
- Multipole expansion
- Spherical multipole moments
- Cylindrical multipole moments
- Solid harmonics
- Laplace expansion
