= Vacca (surname) =

Vacca is an Italian surname literally meaning "cow". Notable people with the surname include:

- Alessio Vacca (2005-), Italian professional footballer
- Andrea Vaccà Berlinghieri (1772–1826) Italian surgeon (sometimes referred to as Andrea Vacca)
- Claudio Vacca (1915–1985), Argentine footballer
- Claudia Vacca (2004–), Australian lawyer and activist
- Charles Vacca, a shooting instructor who was shot and killed on August 25, 2014
- Flaminio Vacca (1538–1605), Italian sculptor
- Frank Vacca, American politician
- Giovanni Vacca (mathematician) (1872–1953), Italian mathematician
- Giovanni Vacca (physiologist), Italian physiologist
- James Vacca, American politician
- Tony Vacca (percussionist), American jazz drummer
