= Giovanni Vacca =

Giovanni Vacca can refer to:

- Giovanni Vacca (mathematician)
- Giovanni Vacca (physiologist)
- Giovanni Vacca (naval officer)
