= Quantum cylindrical quadrupole =

The quantum cylindrical quadrupole is a solution to the Schrödinger equation, $\mathrm{i}\hbar\frac{\partial}{\partial t}\psi(x,t) = -\frac{\hbar^2}{2m}\frac{\partial^2}{\partial x^2}\psi(x,t) +V(x)\psi(x,t),$ where $\hbar$ is the reduced Planck constant, $m$ is the mass of the particle, $\mathrm{i}$ is the imaginary unit and $t$ is time.

One peculiar potential that can be solved exactly is when the electric quadrupole moment is the dominant term of an infinitely long cylinder of charge. It can be shown that the Schrödinger equation is solvable for a cylindrically symmetric electric quadrupole, thus indicating that the quadrupole term of an infinitely long cylinder can be quantized. In the physics of classical electrodynamics, it can be shown that the scalar potential and associated mechanical potential energy of a cylindrically symmetric quadrupole is as follows:

$\mathbf{V}_\mathrm{quad} = \frac{\lambda d^2 Cos[2 \phi]}{4 \pi \epsilon_0 s^2}$ (SI units)
$\mathbf{V}_\mathrm{quad} = \frac{Q \lambda d^2 Cos[2 \phi]}{4 \pi \epsilon_0 s^2}$ (SI units)

Using cylindrical symmetry, the time independent Schrödinger equation becomes the following:

$E \psi(x) = -\frac{\hbar^2}{2m s}\frac{\partial}{\partial s} (s \frac{\partial}{\partial s}) \psi(s,\phi)-\frac{\hbar^2}{2m s^2}\frac{\partial^2}{\partial \phi^2}\psi(s,\phi) +\frac{Q \lambda d^2 Cos[2 \phi]}{4 \pi \epsilon_0 s^2} \psi(s,\phi).$

Using separation of variables, the above equation can be written as two ordinary differential equations in both the radial and azimuthal directions. The radial equation is Bessel's equation as can be seen below. If one changes variables to $x= k s$, Bessel's equation is exactly obtained.

$\frac{1}{x} \frac{\partial}{\partial x} (x \frac{\partial}{\partial x}) S(x)+(1-\frac{\nu^2}{x^2}) S(x)=0$

== Azimuthal equation ==
The azimuthal equation is given by

$\frac{\partial^2}{\partial \phi^2} \Phi(\phi)+(\nu^2-\frac{\lambda q m d^2}{2 \pi \epsilon_0 \hbar} Cos[2 \phi]) \Phi[\phi]=0.$

This is the Mathieu equation,

$$\frac{d^2y}{dx^2}+[a-2q\cos (2x) ]y=0,$$

with $a=\nu^2$ and $q=\frac{\lambda q m d^2}{4 \pi \epsilon_0 \hbar}$.

The solution of the Mathieu equation is expressed in terms of the Mathieu cosine $C(a,q,x)$ and the Mathieu sine $S(a,q,x)$ for unique a and q. This indicates that the quadrupole moment can be quantized in order of the Mathieu characteristic values $a_n$ and $b_n$.

In general, Mathieu functions are not periodic. The term q must be that of a characteristic value in order for Mathieu functions to be periodic. It can be shown that the solution of the radial equation highly depends on what characteristic values are seen in this case.

== See also ==
- Cylindrical multipole moments
