= Giovanni Vacca (mathematician) =

Italian mathematician and historian of science (1872–1953)

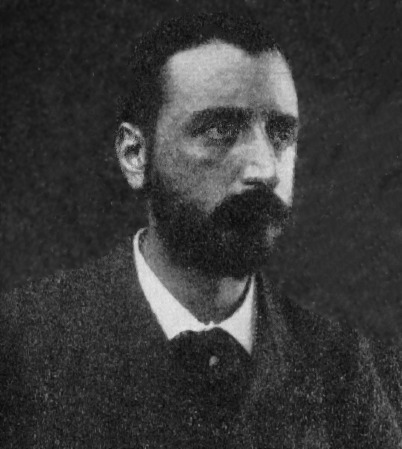
- Born: 18 November 1872; Genoa, Italy
- Died: 6 January 1953 (aged 80); Rome, Italy
- Scientific career
- Fields: Mathematics

Giovanni Enrico Eugenio Vacca (18 November 1872 – 6 January 1953) was an Italian mathematician, Sinologist and historian of science.

Vacca studied mathematics and graduated from the University of Genoa in 1897 under the guidance of G. B. Negri. He was a politically active student and was banished for that from Genoa in 1897. He moved to Turin and became an assistant to Giuseppe Peano. In 1899 he studied, at Hanover, unpublished manuscripts of Gottfried Wilhelm Leibniz, which he published in 1903. Around 1898 Vacca became interested in Chinese language and culture after attending a Chinese exhibition in Turin. He took private lessons of Chinese and continued to study it at the University of Florence. Vacca then traveled to China in 1907–8. Originally he had planned to study the history of Chinese mathematics and ancient and modern science in more detail, but he returned to Europe without truly linking his mathematical interests with the study of Chinese civilization. He pursued the latter professionally, first, as a lecturer of Chinese language and literature at the Istituto di studi superiori di Firenze in 1910, then, in charge of teaching language and literature of the Far East at the University of Rome from 1911 until 1921, transferred to Florence in succession of Carlo Puini as ordinario for History and Geography of East Asia, and finally at the University of Rome, where he held the chair for History and Geography of East Asia from 1923 to his retirement in 1948 when he was in his 76th year. Besides actively contributing to the field of East Asian Studies, Vacca continued in parallel to work on mathematical questions inspired by his intellectual proximity to Peano’s School and his extensive readings of historical sources by Euclid, Archimedes, Euler, Fermat, Napier, and others.

The interests of Vacca were almost equally split between mathematics, Sinology and history of science, with a corresponding number of papers being 38, 47 and 45. In 1910, Vacca developed a complex number iteration for pi:

$$x_0 = i,\quad x_{n+1} = \frac{x_n + |x_n|}2,\qquad\lim_{n\to\infty} x_n = \frac2\pi.$$

The calculation efficiency of these formulas is significantly worse than of the modern Borwein's algorithm – they converge by only about half a decimal point with each iteration.

Vacca published his two major contributions to mathematics in 1910 and 1926, on series expansion (later named Vacca series) of the Euler constant. They are, respectively

$$\begin{align}
\gamma &= \sum_{k=2}^\infty (-1)^k \frac{ \left \lfloor \log_2 k \right \rfloor}{k}
= \tfrac12-\tfrac13
+ 2\left(\tfrac14 - \tfrac15 + \tfrac16 - \tfrac17\right)
+ 3\left(\tfrac18 - \cdots - \tfrac1{15}\right) + \cdots\\[6pt]
\zeta(2) + \gamma  &= \sum_{k=2}^\infty\left(\frac1{\lfloor \sqrt{k} \rfloor^2} - \frac1{k}\right)
= \sum_{k=2}^\infty \frac{k - \lfloor\sqrt{k}\rfloor^2}{k\lfloor\sqrt{k}\rfloor^2} \\[4pt]
& = \tfrac12 + \tfrac23 + \tfrac1{2^2}\left(\tfrac15 + \tfrac26 + \tfrac37 + \tfrac48\right)
+ \tfrac1{3^2}\left(\tfrac1{10} + \cdots + \tfrac6{15}\right) + \cdots
\end{align}$$

Vacca noted in 1910 that:

There is some hope that this series can be of some use in the proof of the irrationality of $\gamma$, a very difficult problem, proposed, but not resolved, in the Correspondence, recently published, between Hermite und Stieltjes.
