= Shooting of Charles Vacca =

Accidental killing of a man by a nine-year-old girl

- Date: August 25, 2014
- Location: White Hills, Arizona, United States

On August 25, 2014, 39-year-old Charles Vacca was unintentionally shot and killed while instructing a nine-year-old girl on how to shoot a Mini-Uzi. The incident occurred in Arizona Last Stop gun range (also known as "Bullets and Burgers") in White Hills, Arizona, where Vacca had worked for about 18 months. According to county law officials the shooting is being viewed as an industrial accident. The minimum age set by the shooting range to fire a weapon is eight years old provided that the child is supervised by a parent, as the girl was. It was also legal for Arizona Last Stop to own the fully automatic Uzi because it was manufactured and purchased prior to the passage of the Firearm Owners Protection Act in 1986 and added to the National Firearms Act machine gun registry where all fully automatic civilian owned firearms are registered.

== Sequence of events ==
According to the girl's father, their family had traveled from their Las Vegas hotel to the Last Stop at approximately 9:45 AM. The family then took a ride on a monster truck before arriving at the gun range. At the range, the girl's father was the first to shoot, followed by the girl herself. The girl's mother videotaped her daughter trying out the Uzi, and said she watched as the gun recoiled and her daughter lost control of it. The girl reportedly said the Uzi was "too much" for her after she fired the weapon and was unable to control the muzzle rise, causing the barrel to be directed at Vacca. Vacca is believed to have died from a single shot to the head. He was airlifted to the University Medical Center hospital in Las Vegas, where he died.

== Reactions ==
The shooting ignited a discussion regarding whether children should be legally allowed to handle fully automatic weapons such as Uzis. Mel Robbins, writing for CNN, argued that it should be against the law for such a young child to shoot an Uzi. She added that, in her view, the girl was not to blame for her instructor's death, but that the instructor and the girl's parents were at fault. The owner of Last Stop, Sam Scarmardo, said it was considered pretty standard to allow children onto the range, and that he was reconsidering this policy in light of the accident. Writing for National Review Online, Robert B. Young wrote that only one other incident had occurred in which a child killed someone with an automatic weapon, and therefore concluded that "two incidents in six years do not make an epidemic, not even a trend." He also concluded that as gun ownership increased, the frequency of serious gun accidents involving children had decreased, attributing this to "improved education for young people becoming acquainted with firearms".

=== Vacca's family members ===
Vacca's family, including his ex-wife, Anamarie Vacca, have said they harbor no ill will toward the girl who accidentally killed Charles Vacca. Anamarie Vacca also said that her children want to write a letter to the girl, "knowing their family has to grieve through the same process." In an interview aired on The Today Show on August 29, Vacca's daughter Ashley said that her father's death was a "tragic accident" and expressed her sympathy for the girl and her family. On September 12, Vacca's four children wrote a letter to the girl, in which they said that "Our dad would want you to know that you should move forward with your life."

On the first anniversary of the shooting, Charles Vacca's children launched the “We Have A Voice” initiative, which is an online petition aimed at building a coalition to support and pass legislation that prohibits young children from using fully automatic weapons.

=== The girl's family members ===
Members of the family of the girl who shot Vacca released a statement on September 2 saying they were "devastated" by the accident. The family's lawyer, Kevin Walsh, stated that the family "prayed day and night that [Vacca] would survive his injury, and they continue to pray for his family during this terribly difficult time."

=== Legislators ===
In response to the shooting, Victoria Steele, a Democratic member of the Arizona House of Representatives, proposed a ban on allowing children under the age of 16 to use machine guns. Steele told the Phoenix New Times that "I'm disgusted that we even need such a law -- that parents can't be trusted to not give a machine gun to a 9-year-old girl." In addition, on September 4, 2014, Democratic senators Barbara Boxer and Dianne Feinstein wrote a letter to the president of the National Shooting Sports Foundation urging him to help implement policies prohibiting children from shooting fully automatic weapons at shooting ranges. In February 2015, the Arizona Division of Occupational Safety and Health recommended that a range-safety officer should be on site at the shooting range where Vacca was shot. They also recommended limiting weapons available to certain shooters and ensuring shooters are comfortable with weapons before they are switched into automatic. In March 2015, Barbara Norton, a Democratic member of the Louisiana House of Representatives, introduced a bill to prohibit children under the age of twelve from using Uzis, this bill was deferred 2 months later.

== Investigations ==
The shooting was investigated by the Arizona Division of Occupational Safety and Health, the state's workplace safety agency. It was also investigated by the Mohave County Sheriff's Office, which, after this investigation concluded, declined to pursue criminal charges against the girl.

On September 2, police reports were released indicating that immediately after the shooting, the girl had said she felt the gun was too much for her and had hurt her shoulder. The report also indicated that the girl's family had been focused on her just after the shooting, because they thought she was injured, and had not realized that Vacca had been shot until one of his colleagues ran over to him.
