= Cylindrical multipole moments =

Cylindrical multipole moments are the coefficients in a series expansion of a potential that varies logarithmically with the distance to a source, i.e., as $\ln \ R$. Such potentials arise in the electric potential of long line charges, and the analogous sources for the magnetic potential and gravitational potential.

For clarity, we illustrate the expansion for a single line charge, then generalize to an arbitrary distribution of line charges. Through this article, the primed coordinates such as $(\rho^{\prime}, \theta^{\prime})$ refer to the position of the line charge(s), whereas the unprimed coordinates such as $(\rho, \theta)$ refer to the point at which the potential is being observed. We use cylindrical coordinates throughout, e.g., an arbitrary vector $\mathbf{r}$ has coordinates $( \rho, \theta, z)$ where $\rho$ is the radius from the $z$ axis, $\theta$ is the azimuthal angle and $z$ is the normal Cartesian coordinate. By assumption, the line charges are infinitely long and aligned with the $z$ axis.

== Cylindrical multipole moments of a line charge ==
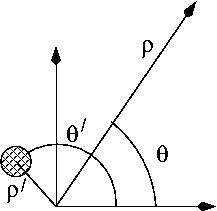
Figure 1: Definitions for cylindrical multipoles; looking down the $z'$ axis

The electric potential of a line charge $\lambda$ located at $(\rho', \theta')$ is given by
$$\Phi(\rho, \theta) = \frac{-\lambda}{2\pi\epsilon} \ln R
= \frac{-\lambda}{4\pi\epsilon} \ln \left| \rho^{2} + \left( \rho' \right)^{2} - 2\rho\rho'\cos (\theta - \theta' ) \right|$$
where $R$ is the shortest distance between the line charge and the observation point.

By symmetry, the electric potential of an infinite line charge has no $z$-dependence. The line charge $\lambda$ is the charge per unit length in the $z$-direction, and has units of (charge/length). If the radius $\rho$ of the observation point is greater than the radius $\rho'$ of the line charge, we may factor out $\rho^{2}$
$$\Phi(\rho, \theta) =
\frac{-\lambda}{4\pi\epsilon} \left\{ 2\ln \rho +
\ln \left( 1 - \frac{\rho^{\prime}}{\rho} e^{i \left(\theta - \theta^{\prime}\right)} \right) \left( 1 - \frac{\rho^{\prime}}{\rho} e^{-i \left(\theta - \theta^{\prime} \right)} \right) \right\}$$
and expand the logarithms in powers of $(\rho'/\rho)<1$
$$\Phi(\rho, \theta) =
\frac{-\lambda}{2\pi\epsilon} \left\{\ln \rho -
\sum_{k=1}^{\infty} \frac{1}{k} \left( \frac{\rho'}{\rho} \right)^k
\left[ \cos k\theta \cos k\theta' + \sin k\theta \sin k\theta' \right] \right\}$$
which may be written as
$$\Phi(\rho, \theta) =
\frac{-Q}{2\pi\epsilon} \ln \rho +
\frac{1}{2\pi\epsilon} \sum_{k=1}^{\infty}
\frac{C_{k} \cos k\theta + S_{k} \sin k\theta}{\rho^{k}}$$
where the multipole moments are defined as
$$\begin{align}
Q &= \lambda ,\\
C_k &= \frac{\lambda}{k} \left( \rho' \right)^k \cos k\theta' , \\
S_{k} &= \frac{\lambda}{k} \left( \rho' \right)^k \sin k\theta'.
\end{align}$$

Conversely, if the radius $\rho$ of the observation point is less than the radius $\rho'$ of the line charge, we may factor out $\left( \rho' \right)^{2}$ and expand the logarithms in powers of $(\rho/\rho')<1$
$$\Phi(\rho, \theta) =
\frac{-\lambda}{2\pi\epsilon} \left\{\ln \rho' -
\sum_{k=1}^{\infty} \left( \frac{1}{k} \right) \left( \frac{\rho}{\rho'} \right)^k
\left[ \cos k\theta \cos k\theta' + \sin k\theta \sin k\theta' \right] \right\}$$
which may be written as
$$\Phi(\rho, \theta) =
\frac{-Q}{2\pi\epsilon} \ln \rho' +
\frac{1}{2\pi\epsilon} \sum_{k=1}^{\infty}
\rho^{k} \left[ I_{k} \cos k\theta + J_{k} \sin k\theta \right]$$
where the interior multipole moments are defined as
$$\begin{align}
Q &= \lambda \ln \rho',  \\
I_k &= \frac{\lambda}{k}
\frac{\cos k\theta'}{\left( \rho' \right)^k}, \\
J_k &= \frac{\lambda}{k} \frac{\sin k\theta'}{\left( \rho' \right)^k}.\end{align}$$

== General cylindrical multipole moments ==
The generalization to an arbitrary distribution of line charges $\lambda(\rho', \theta')$ is straightforward. The functional form is the same
$$\Phi(\mathbf{r}) = \frac{-Q}{2\pi\epsilon} \ln \rho + \frac{1}{2\pi\epsilon} \sum_{k=1}^{\infty} \frac{C_{k} \cos k\theta + S_{k} \sin k\theta}{\rho^k}$$
and the moments can be written
$$\begin{align}
Q &= \int d\theta' \, d\rho' \, \rho' \lambda(\rho', \theta') \\
C_k &= \frac{1}{k} \int d\theta' \, d\rho' \left(\rho'\right)^{k+1}
\lambda(\rho', \theta') \cos k\theta' \\
S_k &= \frac{1}{k} \int d\theta' \, d\rho' \left(\rho'\right)^{k+1}
\lambda(\rho', \theta') \sin k\theta'
\end{align}$$
Note that the $\lambda(\rho', \theta')$ represents the line charge per unit area in the $(\rho-\theta)$ plane.

== Interior cylindrical multipole moments ==
Similarly, the interior cylindrical multipole expansion has the functional form
$$\Phi(\rho, \theta) =
\frac{-Q}{2\pi\epsilon} \ln \rho' +
\frac{1}{2\pi\epsilon} \sum_{k=1}^{\infty}
\rho^{k} \left[ I_{k} \cos k\theta + J_{k} \sin k\theta \right]$$
where the moments are defined
$$\begin{align}
Q &= \int d\theta' \, d\rho' \, \rho' \lambda(\rho', \theta') \\
I_{k} &= \frac{1}{k}
\int d\theta' \, d\rho' \frac{\cos k\theta'}{\left(\rho'\right)^{k-1}}
\lambda(\rho', \theta') \\
J_{k} &= \frac{1}{k}
\int d\theta' \, d\rho' \frac{\sin k\theta'}{\left(\rho'\right)^{k-1}}
\lambda(\rho', \theta')
\end{align}$$

== Interaction energies of cylindrical multipoles ==
A simple formula for the interaction energy of cylindrical multipoles (charge density 1) with a second charge density can be derived. Let $f(\mathbf{r}^{\prime})$ be the second charge density, and define $\lambda(\rho, \theta)$ as its integral over z
$$\lambda(\rho, \theta) = \int dz \, f(\rho, \theta, z)$$

The electrostatic energy is given by the integral of the charge multiplied by the potential due to the cylindrical multipoles
$$U = \int d\theta \, d\rho \, \rho \, \lambda(\rho, \theta) \Phi(\rho, \theta)$$

If the cylindrical multipoles are exterior, this equation becomes
$$U = \frac{-Q_1}{2\pi\epsilon} \int d\rho \, \rho \, \lambda(\rho, \theta) \ln \rho
+ \frac{1}{2\pi\epsilon} \sum_{k=1}^{\infty} \int d\theta \, d\rho
\left[ C_{1k} \frac{\cos k\theta}{\rho^{k-1}} + S_{1k} \frac{\sin k\theta}{\rho^{k-1}}\right] \lambda(\rho, \theta)$$
where $Q_{1}$, $C_{1k}$ and $S_{1k}$ are the cylindrical multipole moments of charge distribution 1. This energy formula can be reduced to a remarkably simple form
$$U = \frac{-Q_{1}}{2\pi\epsilon} \int d\rho \, \rho \, \lambda(\rho, \theta) \ln \rho
+ \frac{1}{2\pi\epsilon} \sum_{k=1}^{\infty} k \left( C_{1k} I_{2k} + S_{1k} J_{2k} \right)$$
where $I_{2k}$ and $J_{2k}$ are the interior cylindrical multipoles of the second charge density.

The analogous formula holds if charge density 1 is composed of interior cylindrical multipoles
$$U = \frac{-Q_1\ln \rho'}{2\pi\epsilon} \int d\rho \, \rho \, \lambda(\rho, \theta)
+ \frac{1}{2\pi\epsilon} \sum_{k=1}^{\infty} k \left( C_{2k} I_{1k} + S_{2k} J_{1k} \right)$$
where $I_{1k}$ and $J_{1k}$ are the interior cylindrical multipole moments of charge distribution 1, and $C_{2k}$ and $S_{2k}$ are the exterior cylindrical multipoles of the second charge density.

As an example, these formulae could be used to determine the interaction energy of a small protein in the electrostatic field of a double-stranded DNA molecule; the latter is relatively straight and bears a constant linear charge density due to the phosphate groups of its backbone.

== See also ==
- Axial multipole moments
- Potential theory
- Quantum cylindrical quadrupole
- Multipole expansion
- Spherical multipole moments
