= Giovanni Vacca (physiologist) =

Italian physiologist

Giovanni Vacca is an Italian physiologist. He is currently a professor of physiology at the University of Eastern Piedmont, Novara Italy and Dean of the medical school of the same university.

His main research interest is cardiovascular physiology.

== Research publications ==
- Grossini E, Molinari C, Mary DA, Ghigo E, Bona G, Vacca G (February 2007). "Intracoronary ghrelin infusion decreases coronary blood flow in anesthetized pigs". Endocrinology. 148 (2): 806–12. doi:10.1210/en.2006-1230. PMID 17110424.
- Caimmi PP, Grossini E, Molinari C, Vacca G, Teodori G (November 2006). "Intracoronary infusion of levosimendan to treat postpericardiotomy heart failure". Ann. Thorac. Surg. 82 (5): e33–4. doi:10.1016/j.athoracsur.2006.06.051. PMID 17062205.
- Molinari C, Sabbatini M, Grossini E, Mary DA, Cannas M, Vacca G (March 2006). "Cardiovascular effects and c-Fos expression in the rat hindbrain in response to innocuous stomach distension". Brain Res. Bull. 69 (2): 140–6. doi:10.1016/j.brainresbull.2005.11.014. PMID 16533662. S2CID 23043090.
- Molinari C, Grossini E, Mary DA, Ribichini F, Surico N, Vacca G (May 2006). "The role of nitric oxide in the peripheral vasoconstriction caused by human placental lactogen in anaesthetized pigs". Exp. Physiol. 91 (3): 603–10. doi:10.1113/expphysiol.2005.032755. PMID 16513823. S2CID 36507852.
- Ribichini F, Ferrero V, Rognoni A, Vacca G, Vassanelli C (2005). "Angiotensin antagonism in coronary artery disease: results after coronary revascularisation". Drugs. 65 (8): 1073–96. doi:10.2165/00003495-200565080-00004. PMID 15907144. S2CID 46985775.

== Fiction ==
- Vacca, Giovanni (1999). Proverbi acquatici. Ananke. p. 160. ISBN 978-88-86626-47-7.
