= Laplace expansion (potential) =

In physics, the Laplace expansion of potentials that are directly proportional to the inverse of the distance ($1 / r$), such as Newton's gravitational potential or Coulomb's electrostatic potential, expresses them in terms of the spherical Legendre polynomials. In quantum mechanical calculations on atoms the expansion is used in the evaluation of integrals of the inter-electronic repulsion.

== Formulation ==
The Laplace expansion is in fact the expansion of the inverse distance between two points. Let the points have position vectors $\textbf{r}$ and $\textbf{r}'$, then the Laplace expansion is
$$\frac{1}{\|\mathbf{r}-\mathbf{r}'\|} = \sum_{\ell=0}^\infty \frac{4\pi}{2\ell+1} \sum_{m=-\ell}^{\ell} (-1)^m \frac{r_{{\scriptscriptstyle<}}^\ell }{r_{\scriptscriptstyle>}^{\ell+1} } Y^{-m}_\ell(\theta, \varphi) Y^m_\ell(\theta', \varphi').$$

Here $\textbf{r}$ has the spherical polar coordinates $(r, \theta, \varphi)$ and $\textbf{r}'$ has $(r', \theta', \varphi')$ with homogeneous polynomials of degree $\ell$. Further r_{<} is min(r, r′) and r_{>} is max(r, r′). The function $Y^m_\ell$ is a normalized spherical harmonic function. The expansion takes a simpler form when written in terms of solid harmonics,
$$\frac{1}{\|\mathbf{r}-\mathbf{r}'\|} = \sum_{\ell=0}^\infty
\sum_{m=-\ell}^\ell (-1)^m  I^{-m}_\ell(\mathbf{r}) R^{m}_\ell(\mathbf{r}')\quad\text{with}\quad \|\mathbf{r}\| > \|\mathbf{r}'\|.$$

== Derivation ==
By the law of cosines,
$$\frac{1}{\|\mathbf{r}-\mathbf{r}'\|} = \frac{1}{\sqrt{r^2 + (r')^2 - 2 r r' \cos\gamma}} =
\frac{1}{r\sqrt{1 + h^2 - 2 h \cos\gamma}} \quad\hbox{with}\quad h := \frac{r'}{r} .$$
We find here the generating function of the Legendre polynomials $P_\ell(\cos\gamma)$:
$$\frac{1}{\sqrt{1 + h^2 - 2 h \cos\gamma}} = \sum_{\ell=0}^\infty h^\ell P_\ell(\cos\gamma).$$
Use of the spherical harmonic addition theorem
$$P_{\ell}(\cos \gamma) = \frac{4\pi}{2\ell + 1} \sum_{m=-\ell}^\ell (-1)^m Y^{-m}_\ell(\theta, \varphi) Y^m_\ell (\theta', \varphi')$$
gives the desired result.

== Neumann expansion ==
A similar equation has been derived by Carl Gottfried Neumann that allows expression of $1/r$ in prolate spheroidal coordinates as a series:
$$\frac{1}{|\mathbf{r}-\mathbf{r}'|} = \frac{4\pi}{a} \sum_{\ell=0}^\infty \sum_{m=-\ell}^\ell (-1)^m \frac{(\ell-|m|)!}{(\ell+|m|)!} \mathcal{P}_\ell^{|m|}(\sigma_{<}) \mathcal{Q}_\ell^{|m|}(\sigma_{>}) Y_\ell^m(\arccos\tau,\varphi) Y_\ell^{m*}(\arccos\tau',\varphi')$$
where $\mathcal{P}_\ell^{m}(z)$ and $\mathcal{Q}_\ell^{m}(z)$ are associated Legendre functions of the first and second kind, respectively, defined such that they are real for $z\in(1, \infty)$. In analogy to the spherical coordinate case above, the relative sizes of the radial coordinates are important, as $\sigma_{<}=\min(\sigma, \sigma')$ and $\sigma_{>}=\max(\sigma, \sigma')$.
