= Monopole (mathematics) =

In mathematics, a monopole is a connection over a principal bundle G with a section of the associated adjoint bundle.

== Physical interpretation ==
Physically, such a monopole can be interpreted in a gauge theory coupled to a scalar field as a configuration of the scalar and gauge fields which satisfies the Bogomolny equations and has finite action. Due to the presence of a scalar field, this monopole is an example of an 't Hooft–Polyakov monopole and should not be confused with the singular monopole solutions to Maxwell's equations which are mathematically described by nontrivial principal bundles.

== See also ==
- Nahm equations
- Instanton
- Magnetic monopole
- Yang–Mills theory
