= Heriot-Watt University =

University in Edinburgh, Scotland

- Coat of arms
- Motto: Leaders in ideas and solutions
- Type: Public
- Established: 1821 – School of Arts of Edinburgh; 1852 – Watt Institution and School of Arts; 1885 – Heriot-Watt College; 1966 – university by Royal Charter
- Affiliations: Association of Commonwealth Universities; Universities Scotland; Universities UK
- Endowment: £13.2 million (2025)
- Budget: £293.9 million (2024/25)
- Chancellor: Vacant
- Principal: Nola Hewitt-Dundas
- Faculty: 925 Scotland based (2023)
- Administrative staff: 1,737
- Students: Global: 31,000; Edinburgh: 9,845 (2024/25)
- Undergraduates: Edinburgh: 6,890 (2024/25)
- Postgraduates: Edinburgh: 2,955 (2024/25)
- Location: Edinburgh, Scotland, United Kingdom
- Campus: Suburban
- Other campus locations: Scottish Borders; Orkney; Dubai; Malaysia
- Website: www.hw.ac.uk

Heriot-Watt University (Scottish Gaelic: Oilthigh Heriot-Watt) is a public research university based in Edinburgh, Scotland. It was established in 1821 as the School of Arts of Edinburgh, the world's first mechanics' institute, and was subsequently granted university status by royal charter in 1966. It is the eighth-oldest higher education institution in the United Kingdom. The name Heriot-Watt was taken from Scottish inventor James Watt and Scottish philanthropist and goldsmith George Heriot.

The annual income of the institution for 2024–25 was £293.9 million of which £52.3 million was from research grants and contracts, with an expenditure of £301.1 million. Known for its focus on science as well as engineering, it is one of the 23 colleges that were granted university status in the 1960s, and it is sometimes considered a plate glass university, like Lancaster and York.

The university has three campuses in Scotland and one each in the UAE and Malaysia.

== History ==
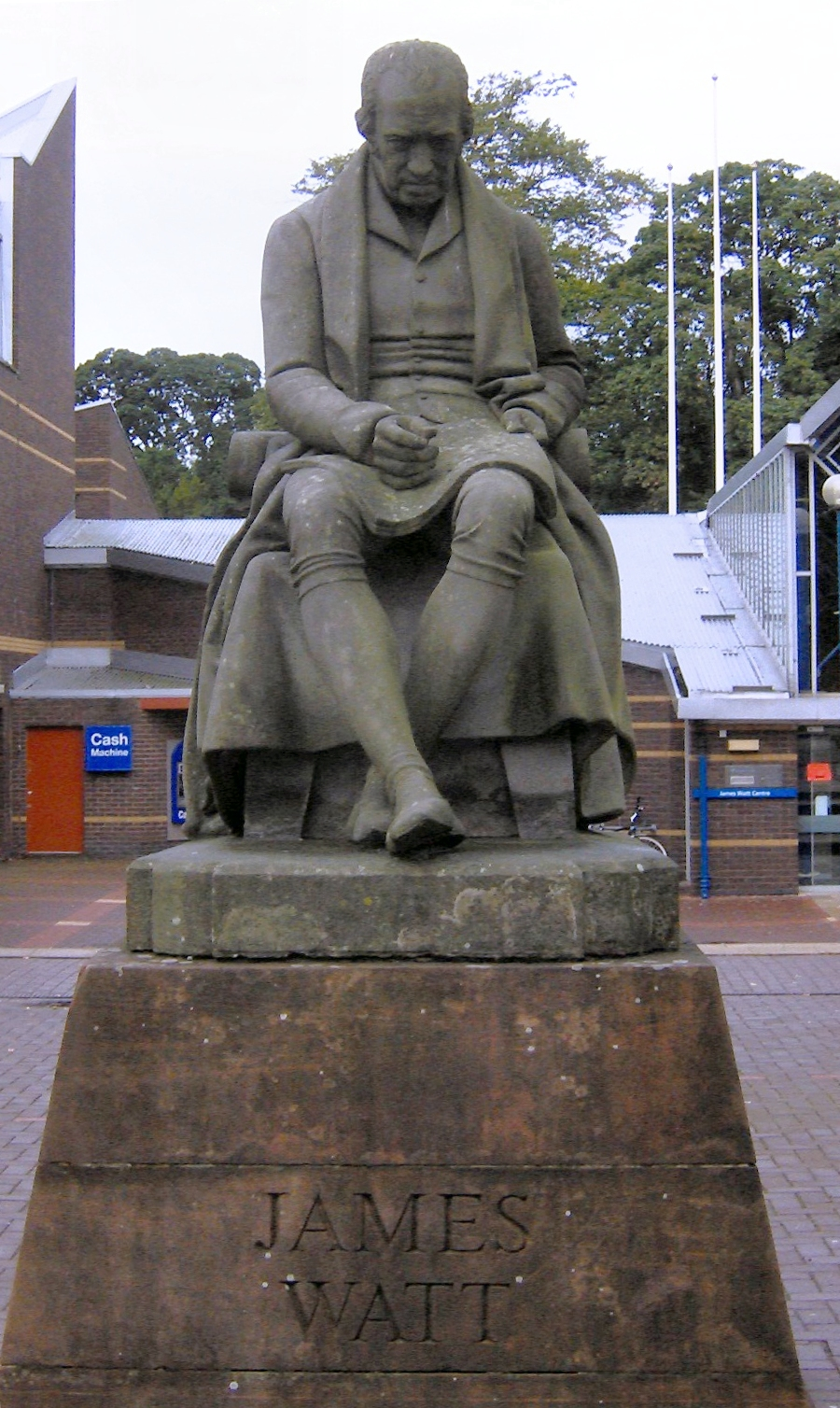
This statue of James Watt commissioned for the School of Arts today sits at Heriot-Watt's Edinburgh Campus.

=== School of Arts of Edinburgh ===
Heriot-Watt was established as the School of Arts of Edinburgh (not to be confused with Edinburgh College of Art (Note: That article says its roots were in 1760.)) by Scottish businessman Leonard Horner on 16 October 1821. Having been inspired by Anderson's College in Glasgow, Horner established the school to provide practical knowledge of science and technology to Edinburgh's working men. The institution was initially of modest size, giving lectures two nights a week in rented rooms and it had a small library of around 500 technical works. It was also oversubscribed, with admissions soon closing despite the cost of 15 shillings for a year's access to lectures and the library.

The school was managed by a board of eighteen directors and primarily funded by sponsors from the middle and upper classes, including Robert Stevenson and Walter Scott. It first became associated with the inventor and engineer James Watt in 1824, as a means of raising funds to secure permanent accommodation. Justifying the association, School Director Lord Cockburn said:

"[The building] shall be employed for the accommodation of the Edinburgh School of Arts; whereby the memory of Watt may forever be connected with the promotion, among a class of men to which he himself originally belonged, of those mechanical arts from which his own usefulness and glory arose. "

In 1837, the School of Arts moved to leased accommodation on Adam Square, which it purchased in 1851 with funds raised in Watt's name. In honour of the purchase, the School changed its name to the Watt Institution and School of Arts in 1852. The statue of Watt was added in front of the Adam Square school in 1854 and has since moved as the premises moved.

=== Watt Institution and School of Arts ===
Heriot-Watt's time as the Watt Institution marked a transitional period for the organisation, as its curriculum broadened to include several subjects beyond mathematics and the physical sciences. While the School of Arts had catered almost exclusively to working-class artisans and technical workers, the Watt Institution admitted a large number of middle-class students, whom it attracted with new subjects in the sciences, social sciences and humanities. By 1885, the skilled working class were no longer the majority in an institution that had been created explicitly for them.

A shifting class make-up was not the only demographic change to affect the student body: in 1869 women were permitted to attend lectures for the first time. This move put the Watt Institution some way ahead of Scottish universities, who were only permitted to allow women to graduate 20 years later following the Universities (Scotland) Act 1889 (52 & 53 Vict. c. 55). The decision to admit women was made in large part owing to pressure from local campaigner Mary Burton, who later became the institution's first female director in 1874.

In 1870, the Watt Institution was forced to move when Adam Square was demolished. After a brief period on Roxburgh Place, it relocated to the newly constructed Chambers Street near its former site. The move caused the institution severe financial difficulties, which were compounded by a combination of declining funds from subscribers and increased costs from its growing student body.

In 1873, the directors turned to George Heriot's Trust for support and agreed to a merger of the Trust's endowment with the institution's own. The proposed merger was provisional to changes in the structure of the Watt Institution, which would see the organisation become a technical college with representatives of the Trust in management positions. Accepting these changes, the Watt Institution officially became Heriot-Watt College in 1885 and was subsequently on far firmer financial ground.

==== The Watt Club ====
The Watt Club was founded at the Watt Institution on 12 May 1854, and is today the oldest alumni organisation in the UK. Following the unveiling of a statue of James Watt outside the institution, local jeweller J. E Vernon proposed that

"[a club should be formed] whose object would be to sup together on the anniversary of the birth of James Watt…and also to promote the interests of the School, by raising a fund each year to provide prizes."

Watt Club Medals are still awarded by the organisation each year to Heriot-Watt's most highly achieving students, while the Watt Club Prize is awarded by The Watt Club Council to recognise student initiative and enterprise.

=== Heriot-Watt College ===
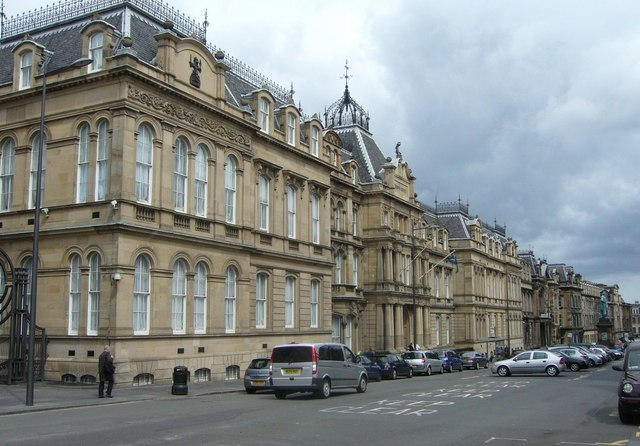
The former site of Heriot-Watt College on Chambers Street, today occupied by the Edinburgh Crown Office

After the establishment of Heriot-Watt as a technical college, the new management committee set about extending the institution's buildings and strengthening its academic reputation. In its new form the college was one of only three non-university institutions in the UK with the power to appoint professors, and the first of these was appointed in 1887. In 1902 the college became a central institution, while in 1904 it introduced awards for graduating students which were similar to university degrees.

Heriot-Watt College and George Heriot's Trust Order Confirmation Act 1927
- Act of Parliament
- Parliament of the United Kingdom
- Long title: An Act to confirm a Provisional Order under the Private Legislation Procedure (Scotland) Act 1899 relating to Heriot-Watt College and George Heriot's Trust.
- Citation: 17 & 18 Geo. 5. c. cxxi

Dates
- Royal assent: 22 December 1927
Other legislation
Relates to	Private Legislation Procedure (Scotland) Act 1899

Text of statute as originally enacted

Expansion meant that the college made increasing demands on George Heriot's Trust throughout the first part of the 20th century, which ultimately led to the independence of the two bodies by the Heriot-Watt College and George Heriot's Trust Order Confirmation Act 1927 (17 & 18 Geo. 5. c. cxxi). While the trust continued to pay Heriot-Watt a fixed sum each year, from then on the college was responsible for managing its own financial affairs. Heriot-Watt continued to expand after becoming independent, opening a new extension in 1935.

Both World Wars impacted on the speed of the college's expansion. During World War I, student numbers dropped as young men joined the army, while teaching in engineering stalled as the department was used for the manufacture of shells and munitions. During World War II, student numbers dropped again and the electrical engineering department became involved in training the armed services in the use of radar.

After the college introduced a postgraduate award in 1951, it offered awards equivalent to university degrees and doctorates in all practical respects. Recognising this, in 1963 the Robbins Report recommended that it should be awarded university status. On 1 February 1966, the recommendation was enacted, as the institution officially became Heriot-Watt University. The Royal Charter was granted by Her Majesty Queen Elizabeth II on 4 March 1966, formally conferred university status on Heriot-Watt.

=== Heriot-Watt University ===
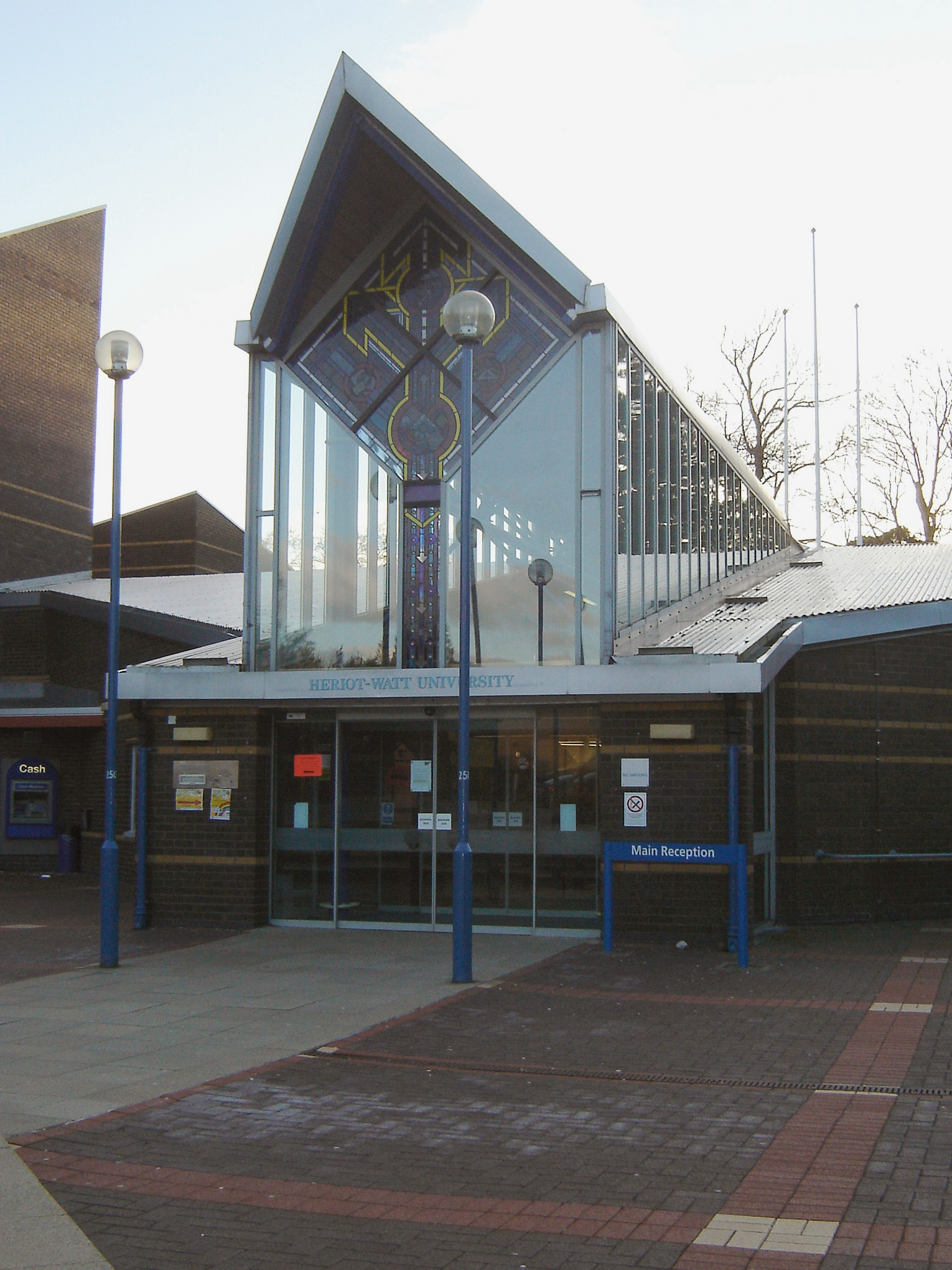

The first personal chair was appointed in 1974.

While Heriot-Watt continued to expand in the centre of Edinburgh after attaining university status, the institution had grown big enough that relocation was felt to be desirable. In 1966 Midlothian County Council gifted the Riccarton estate north of Currie to the university, and in 1969 work began on transforming the site into a future campus. The process of relocation to Riccarton continued until 1992, with teaching and facilities divided between the new campus and the city centre until then.

The university has continued to grow after completing its move to Riccarton, constructing additional student halls, a sports centre and a postgraduate centre on the site. The institution also expanded beyond Edinburgh, merging with the Scottish College of Textiles to create a campus in the Scottish Borders in 1998, and opening a campus in Dubai in 2006 and a campus in Putrajaya, Malaysia, in 2012.

In recent years, the university's campus in Edinburgh has benefited from major infrastructural projects worth £60 million, with another £68 million worth investment announced. These include the UK's first purpose-built graduate centre (£6 million), Scotland's elite Oriam Sports Performance Centre facility (£33 million), and the UK's first FlexBIO flexible downstream bioprocessing centre (£2 million). It is also constructing a 5,000 m^{2} Watt Innovation Building supporting Global Research, Innovation and Discovery [GRID] to boost 'creativity and ideas generation' on the university's growing Edinburgh campus. The university has plans to host a major £65 million film studio and a £2.5 million academic partnership with the oil and gas firm Total. However, in 2017 it was also announced that a major budget shortfall and the impact of Brexit would result in Heriot-Watt shedding 100 jobs by voluntary redundancies.

== Campuses ==
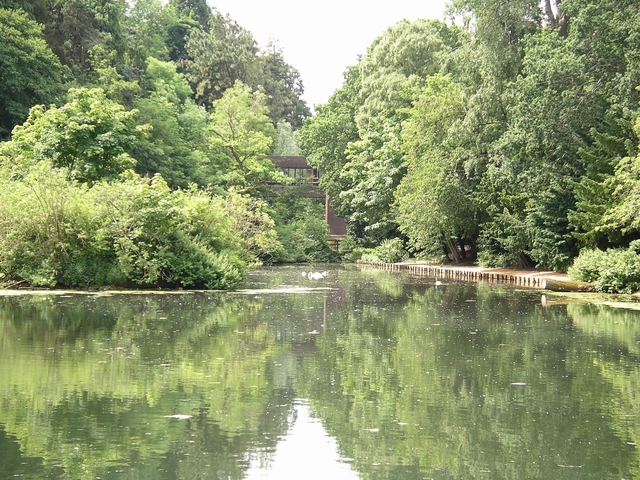
A view of the loch at Edinburgh Campus

Heriot-Watt currently has five campuses, and also runs distance learning programmes through 53 approved learning partners to students around the world.

=== Edinburgh ===
Heriot-Watt's main campus is located in Riccarton in South West Edinburgh on 380 acres (150 hectares) of parkland. The campus consists of: academic buildings, student residences, a postgraduate centre, shops, several library collections, childcare, healthcare, a chaplaincy, a variety of recreational and sports facilities, and a museum, as well as the Student Union's main premises. It is also home to the Edinburgh Conference Centre and Europe's oldest research park, Heriot-Watt University Research Park which opened in 1971. The university's Institute of Petroleum Engineering is based at its Edinburgh campus.

=== Scottish Borders ===
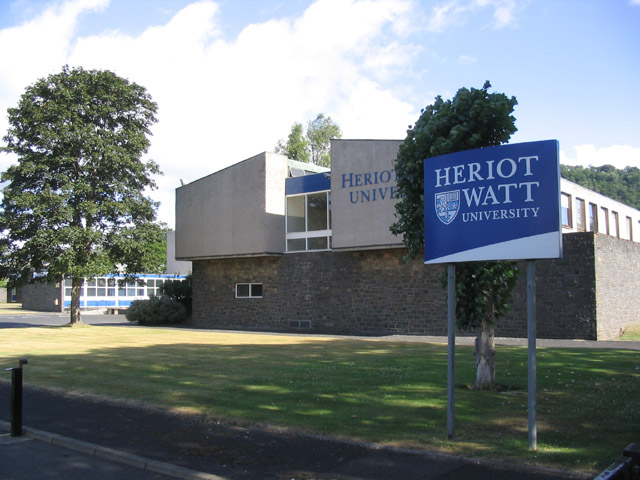
Scottish Borders Campus

Heriot-Watt's Scottish Borders Campus in Galashiels is home to the university's School of Textiles and Design. The school began life in 1883 when the Galashiels Manufacturer's Corporation began running classes in practical courses for its workers. The institution gradually grew both in terms of student numbers and the number of courses it offered, and it ultimately became known as the Scottish College of Textiles in 1968. In 1998 the college merged with Heriot-Watt, leading to the creation of the School of Textiles and Design in its modern form.

The school is one of the few fashion schools in the world which offers a menswear course at bachelor's degree level, and the only school in Scotland to offer a fashion communication course. It was ranked 11th place in the UK for art and design in the 2013 Complete University Guide, produced a winner and five other finalists for the Scottish Fashion Awards Graduate of the Year in June 2012.

While the Scottish Borders Campus shares some facilities and administrative functions with Edinburgh, it is largely self-contained. As well as its own library, accommodation and catering facilities, it has its own branch of the Student Union which runs events on the site and is home to a collection of textile records and artefacts. A new £12M student village opened at the Campus in September 2012.

The entire campus is shared with Borders College, whose students make up the majority of those who study at the site.

Marillion's 1985 song Kayleigh was inspired by an SCT student, and refers to the snow and college halls of Galashiels.

=== Dubai ===
Heriot-Watt's Dubai campus opened in 2005. It was the first British university to set up in Dubai International Academic City.

Offering a range of undergraduate and postgraduate courses similar to those found in Scotland, the campus facilitates student exchanges between Britain and the Gulf Emirates. It has facilities including a library, computer laboratory, cafes and restaurants. An expanded campus opened in the city on 3 November 2011, allowing double the number of students to study for a Heriot-Watt degree in the city.

In April 2019, Heriot-Watt's Dubai campus was crowned 'Best University' in the Middle East at the first ever Forbes Middle East Higher Education Awards.

The campus received a five-star rating for three consecutive years in 2019, 2020 and 2021 from the Knowledge and Human Development Authority (KHDA), the supreme educational quality assurance and regulatory authority of the Government of Dubai.

In 2021, the university relocated its Dubai campus to Dubai Knowledge Park. The new campus was officially opened by His Majesty King Charles III on 30 November 2023, accompanied by Scotland's First Minister, Humza Yousaf.

=== Malaysia ===
Heriot-Watt University Malaysia's purpose-built campus opened in Putrajaya in September 2014, £35 million was invested in the Malaysian campus, which is the first "green campus" in the country. It is situated in a lakeside location of 4 3/4 acres (1.9 hectares), offering undergraduate as well as master's degrees.

=== Orkney ===
Heriot-Watt's campus in Stromness, Orkney, is home to the International Centre for Island Technology (ICIT), part of the university's School of Energy, Geoscience, Infrastructure and Society. The Campus provides education to a small number of postgraduate students and is host to eight members of research staff.

== Organisation ==
Heriot-Watt is divided into six schools and one institute that coordinate its teaching and research:

- The School of Energy, Geoscience, Infrastructure and Society, incorporating geoenergy engineering and renewable energy technology, architectural engineering, civil & structural engineering, construction management & surveying, geography and urban studies
- The School of Engineering and Physical Sciences, incorporating chemical engineering, chemistry, electrical, electronic and computing engineering, mechanical engineering and physics
- The School of Social Sciences (formerly, School of Management and Languages), incorporating accountancy and finance, business management, economics and languages and the Edinburgh Business School, which offers postgraduate courses at MBA, MSc and DBA level
- The School of Mathematical and Computer Sciences, incorporating actuarial mathematics and statistics, computer science and mathematics
- The School of Textiles and Design
- The Global College which offers a foundation pathway to Heriot-Watt University degrees
- The Urban Institute, a research collaboration for urban studies between Heriot-Watt University and The University of Edinburgh

From 1 August 2016, the former School of Life Sciences was merged with other schools, with programmes transferred to the School of Management and Languages, the School of Energy, Geoscience, Infrastructure and Society and the School of Engineering and Physical Sciences.

== Academic profile ==
=== Rankings and reputation ===
Rankings
National rankings
- Complete (2027): 31
- Guardian (2027): 29
- Times / Sunday Times (2027): 41

Global rankings
- ARWU (2026): 701–800
- QS (2027): 325
- THE (2026): 401–500

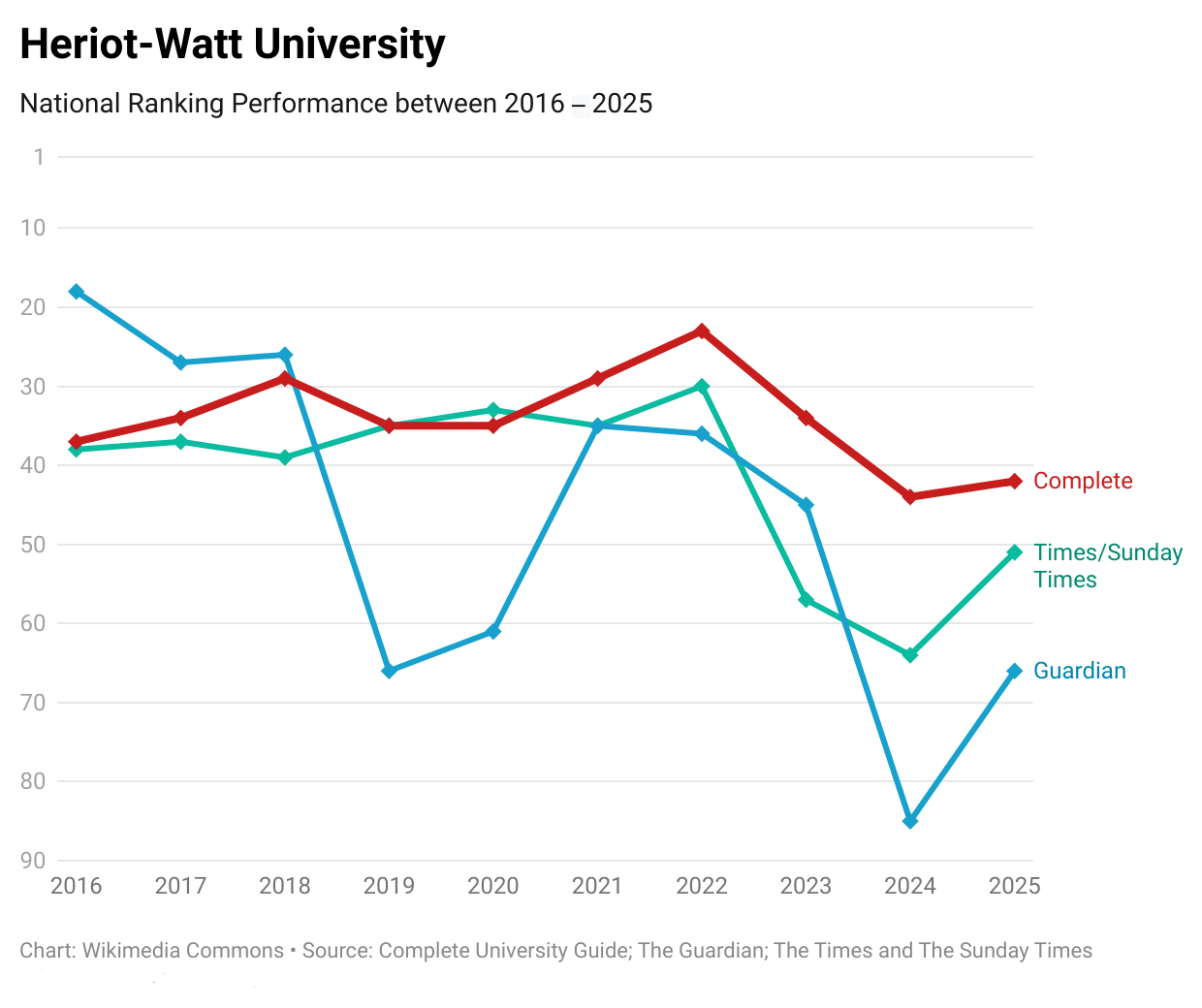
Heriot-Watt University's national league table performance over the past ten years

Heriot-Watt University was named International University of the Year by The Times and Sunday Times Good University Guide 2018. Heriot-Watt is known for the strong prospects of its students, with 80% in graduate-level jobs or further study six months after leaving the institution.

In 2011, Heriot-Watt was named as The Sunday Times Scottish University of the Year 2011–2012, with the paper emphasising the employability of the institution's graduates. In 2012, it was again Scottish University of the Year 2012–2013 for the second year running, and also became UK University of the Year for student experience. The same year it came 1st in Scotland and 4th in the UK in the 2012 National Student Survey.

Times Higher Education's 'Table of Tables' is the combined results of the three main UK university league tables – the Good University Guide (published by The Times and The Sunday Times), The Guardian and The Complete University Guide. In the Table of Tables 2015, Heriot-Watt was placed 27th in the UK and 3rd in Scotland. It is ranked 28th in the UK by The Complete University Guide 2018 and 26th in the UK by The Guardian University League Table 2018. In a 2015 detail report on UK universities, Durham academic Vikki Boliver placed Oxford and Cambridge in the first tier, and included Heriot-Watt in the second tier made of the remaining 22 Russell Group universities and 17 other "pre-92" universities.

In 2020, Heriot-Watt was ranked at 314 by QS World University Rankings and at 251–300 by Times Higher Education World University Rankings in the world. It was ranked 243rd in the world for engineering and technology by QS Rankings in 2019. It was ranked 143rd in the world for technical sciences in 2018 by Round University Ranking.

It was ranked among 201-250 globally for Business and Economics by Times in 2019. In 2018, ARWU ranked Heriot-Watt globally among 51–75 for Telecom Engineering and 101–150 for Civil Engineering, Mathematics and Oceanography.

Nationally, the university is ranked highly for Planning and Building education. In 2019, the university was ranked 4th in UK and 1st in Scotland for Town & Country Planning and Landscape Design by The Complete University Guide. It was also ranked 9th in UK and 1st in Scotland for Building and Town & Country Planning by The Guardian in the same year. In the 2019 The Complete University Guide national subject rankings Heriot-Watt had the following rankings: 2nd (of 34) – Building education, 17th (of 104) – Accounting and Finance, 15th (of 81) – Art and Design, 14th (of 30) – Chemical Engineering, 23rd (of 60) – Chemistry, 1 (of 56) – Civil Engineering, 25th (of 110) – Computer Science, 22nd (of 77) – Economics, 23rd (of 68) – Electrical Engineering, 15th (of 72) – Mathematics, 14th (of 69) – Mechanical Engineering, and 25th (of 48) – Physics and Astronomy. The university has been constantly ranked among the top 10 universities in UK for Building education since 2010.

=== Admissions ===
As of February 2017, approximately 13,700 students are enrolled at one of Heriot-Watt's campuses: 66.6% in Scotland, 24.2% in Dubai and 9.2% in Malaysia. In the Scotland campus, the university has a female:male ratio of 41:59.

=== Masters in Strategic Project Management ===
Under the framework of the European Education system and as part of the Erasmus Mundus program Heriot-Watt University offers a Masters in Strategic Project Management jointly with Politecnico di Milano (Italy) and Umeå University (Sweden). Students in the program study at all three institutions over two years and at the conclusion receive degrees issued by all three. The program ranks number 11 in the Eduniversal Best Masters Ranking and number 25 in the QS World University Rankings worldwide.

== Student life ==
=== Student Union ===
The Student Union at Heriot-Watt is a student-led organisation headed by individuals elected from the student population. The association has represented students both locally and nationally since its foundation in 1966, and is a member of both the Edinburgh Students' Forum and the National Union of Students (NUS). It is also responsible for running the university's Student Union, which runs events for students and supports student societies. Over 50 societies currently exist, including the Brewing Society which organises an annual charity beer festival. In addition, the Student Union runs many services at the Edinburgh and Scottish Borders campuses including catering facilities, a nightclub, an advice centre and a student shop. The Student Union also works closely with the Heriot-Watt University Dubai Student Council and the Heriot-Watt University Malaysia Student Association. In 2018 the Student Union won the University Student Union of the Year and also Officer Team of the Year at the NUS Scotland Awards 2018.

=== Sports Union ===
The Sports Union is responsible for the university's 35 sports clubs. and runs annual social events for students involved in sport. As with the Students' Association, the organisation is headed by elected Heriot-Watt students.

== Controversies ==
=== Raytheon ===
In July 2025, Liberty Investigates and The Herald, using Freedom of Information laws, alleged collusion between Heriot-Watt University and Raytheon UK, a weapons manufacturer. In preparation for a Careers Fair held at the University in February 2025, Raytheon UK made requests for monitoring university groups, notice boards, CCTV monitoring and enhanced security patrols, to which a University Security staff member agreed. The University published a statement addressing the issues raised.

== Notable alumni ==
=== Arts ===
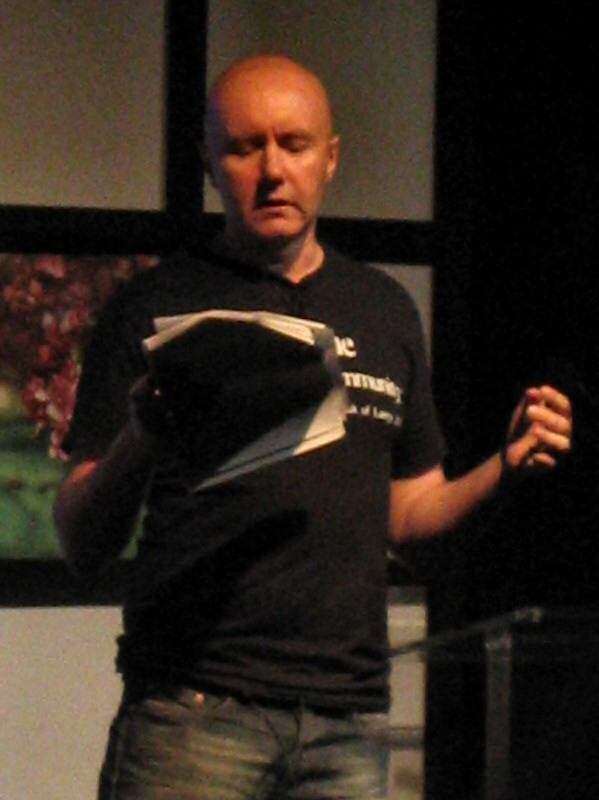
Irvine Welsh

- Theodore S. Clerk, (1909–1965), city planner, first Ghanaian architect and developer of the port city of Tema
- Sir James Dunbar-Nasmith (born 1927), conservation architect and head of ECA's Department of Architecture 1978–1988
- Sir Nicholas Grimshaw (born 1939), architect of the Eden Project, president of the Royal Academy since 2004
- Sir William Kininmonth (1904–1988), architect of Adam House and Pollock Halls, both in Edinburgh
- Lynn Kinnear (1960-2024), landscape architect
- Kygo, Norwegian DJ and record producer (did not graduate)
- Sir Robert Matthew (1906–1975), designed the Royal Commonwealth Pool and founded RMJM
- John McAslan, architect
- Taqi Nazeer, Scottish born actor
- John Notman (1810–1865), architect and landscape architect
- Patrick Nuttgens (1930–2004), academic and writer on architecture
- Nivetha Pethuraj, Indian actress
- Dame Muriel Spark, British writer (took a course in commercial correspondence and précis writing at Heriot-Watt College)
- Sir Basil Spence (1907–1976), architect of Coventry Cathedral and the New Zealand Parliament Building (nicknamed 'The Beehive') in Wellington, New Zealand
- Douglas Stuart, British writer, fashion designer, winner of 2020 Booker Prize
- John Thomson, pioneering photographer
- Deepak Tripathi, historian and former journalist
- Irvine Welsh, British writer of the novel Trainspotting
- Greg Wise, British actor and producer
- Joanne Yeoh, Malaysian violinist and music lecturer at Universiti Putra Malaysia
- Gary Younge, writer and journalist
- Casa Yuen, South Africa-born former Hong Kong TVB actress

=== Academia and science ===
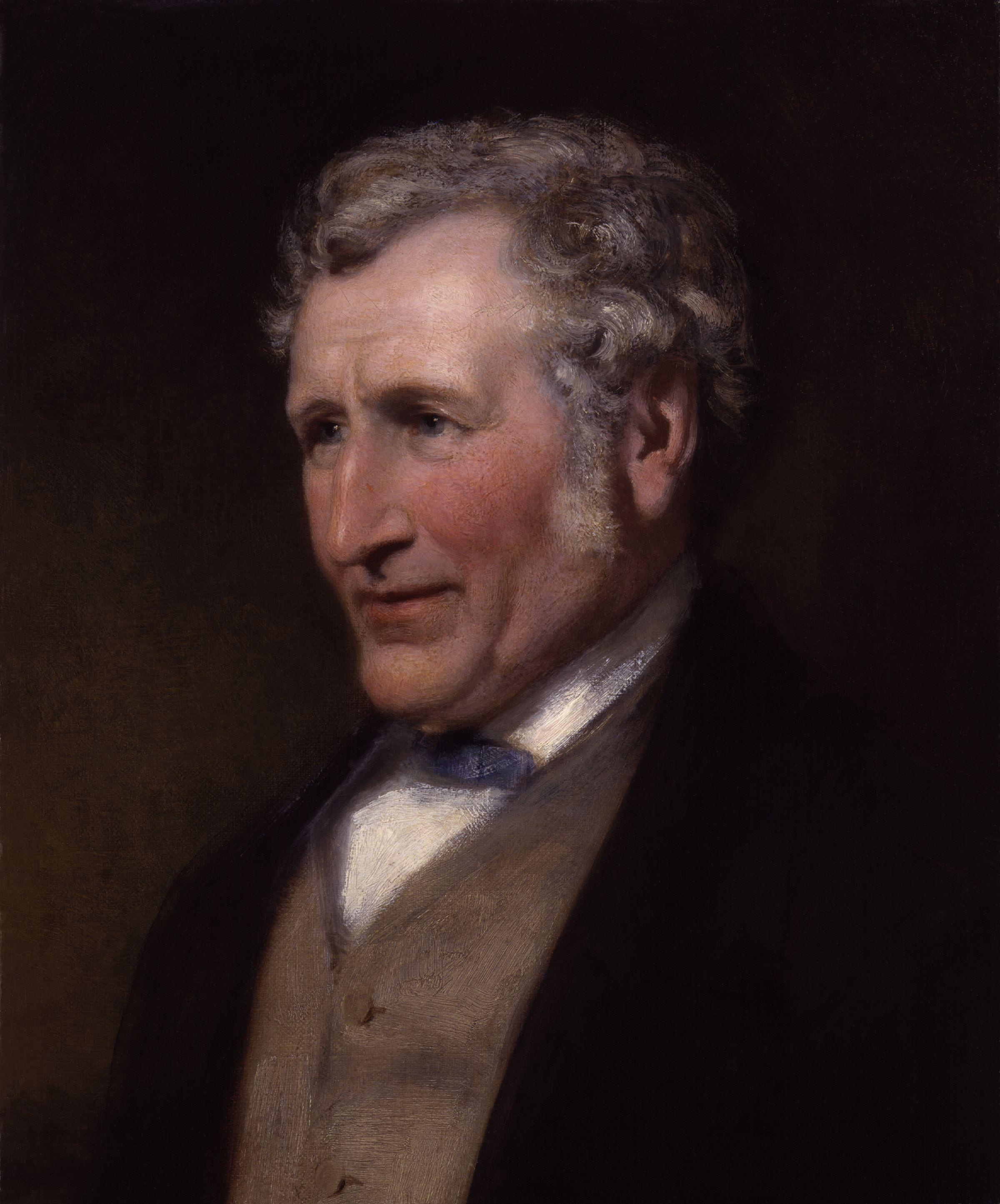
James Nasmyth

- Le Hai An (1971–2019), Deputy Minister of Education and Training of Vietnam and rector of Hanoi University of Mining and Geology
- Iain Baikie, physicist, winner of Swan Medal and Prize
- Christina Miller, chemist
- David A. B. Miller, applied physicist; winner of R. W. Wood Prize and Adolph Lomb Medal
- James Nasmyth, inventor of the steam hammer
- Evelyn Roxburgh (1896–1973), electrical engineer
- Sarah Tabrizi, neurologist
- Chris Whitty, physician; Chief Medical Advisor to the UK Government

=== Business ===
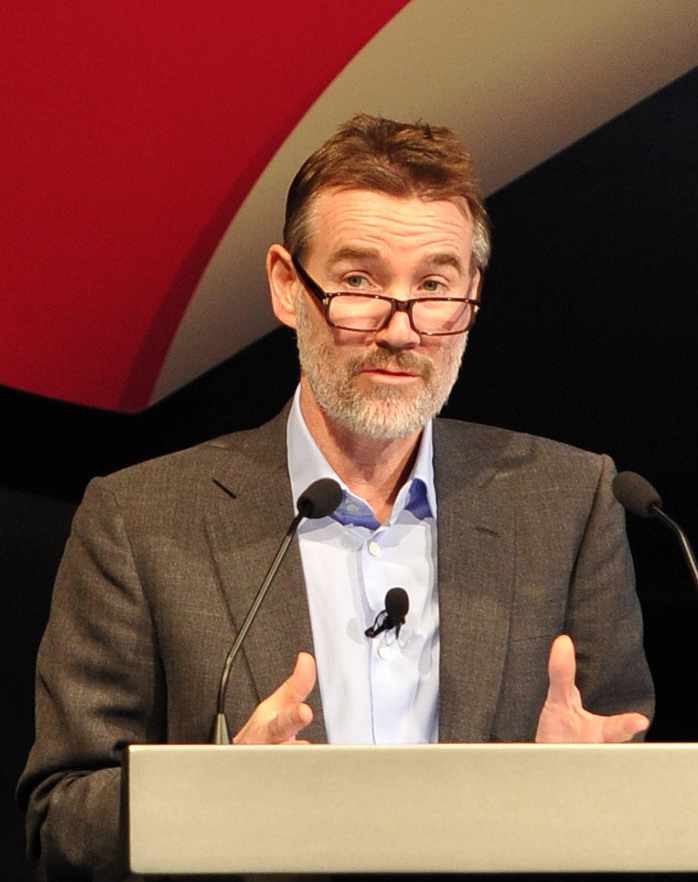
Adam Crozier

- David Alliance, Baron Alliance (1932-2025), businessman and politician
- Robert Buchan, British/Canadian businessman, founder of Kinross Gold Corporation
- Adam Crozier, British businessman, chief executive and television executives; Chief Executive of ITV
- Roger Jenkins, British financier, former Chief Executive of Barclays Private Equity, Principal Investments and Structured Capital Markets
- Bob Keiller, British businessman, former Chief Executive of Wood Group
- Michael Lombardi, Canadian businessman, founder of Lombardi Media Corporation
- Ian Ritchie, British businessman, founder of OWL, missed WWW opportunity of Tim Berners-Lee
- Maurice Tulloch (born 1969), British/Canadian businessman, CEO of Aviva
- Per Valebrokk, Norwegian editor and business man, partner of Storm Communications

=== Politics ===
- Nathif Jama Adam, Kenyan banker and politician
- Sarah Boyack, former MSP and Minister for Transport of Scotland
- Liam Burns, NUS UK president 2011–2013
- Ingvald Godal, former member of the Norwegian Parliament and former chairman of the Norwegian Support Committee for Chechnya
- Bernie Grant, British Labour Party politician, the Member of Parliament for Tottenham from 1987 to 2000; Britain's first Afro-Caribbean MP (did not graduate)
- Fiona Hyslop MSP, Cabinet Secretary for Culture and External Affairs in the Scottish Government
- Hassan Ali Khaire, Somali politician, Prime Minister of Somalia
- Archy Kirkwood, Baron Kirkwood of Kirkhope, former Liberal Democrat MP
- Mark MacGregor, Conservative Party politician
- Gillian Mackay, Green Party MSP for Central Scotland
- Graham Watson, former MEP; Leader of the European Parliament's Liberal Group 2002–2009 and president of the EU's Liberal Democratic Party 2011–2015
- Lord Mike Watson, Baron Watson of Invergowrie, former MP and MSP
- Henry McLeish, former First Minister of Scotland
- Brian Monteith, former Conservative MSP
- Henning Skumsvoll, member of the Norwegian Parliament
- Teo Ho Pin, former member of the Singapore Parliament
- Ravi Philemon, co-founder of Singapore's extra-parliamentary opposition party Red Dot United
- Fiona Watson, political affairs officer

=== Sports ===
- Jock Clear, Formula One engineer
- Luke Crosbie, Scotland national rugby union team player
- Joe Hendry, Scottish professional wrestler
- Lee Jones, Scotland national rugby union team player
- Shirley Robertson, TV presenter and double Olympic gold medallist
- Jack Ross, British professional footballer
- Gordon Shedden, British auto racing driver
- Kirsty Smith, Scottish soccer player for the Scotland women's national football team and West Ham United F.C. Women.
- Steve Alleyne was an English-born Barbadian cricketer, who played for Scotland in List A cricket.
- Cemil Çıpa, a Turkish racing driver and property developer.

== Notable staff ==
- Sir Thomas Hudson Beare, chair of mechanics and engineering, 1887–1889
- George Murray Burnett (1921–1980), served as principal, 1974–1980
- Andrew John Herbertson, lecturer in industrial and commercial geography, 1896–1899
- Sir Geoff Palmer, grain scientist and human rights advocate, 1977–2025

=== Principals ===
- Sir Francis Grant Ogilvie, 1886–1900
- Arthur Pillans Laurie, 1900–1928
- James Cameron Smail, 1928–1950
- Hugh Bryan Nisbet, 1950–1967
- Robert Allan Smith, 1968–1974
- George Murray Burnett, 1974–1980
- Thomas Lothian Johnston,1981–1988
- Sir Alistair George James MacFarlane,1989–1996
- John Stuart Archer, 1997–2006
- Sir Vito Antonio Muscatelli, 2007–2009
- Steven Kenneth Chapman, 2009–2015
- Richard Andrew Williams, 2015–2026
- Nola Hewitt-Dundas, 2026–present

== See also ==
- Armorial of UK universities
- Edinburgh Business School
- Heriot-Watt University F.C.
- List of UK universities
