= Andrew Schofield =

Andrew Schofield may refer to:

- Andrew Schofield (actor) (born 1958), also known as Drew Schofield, British actor
- Andrew N. Schofield (born 1930), British civil engineer
- Andy Schofield (Andrew John Schofield), theoretical physicist
