= Dr. Chapman =

Dr. Chapman may refer to:

- Dr. Allan Chapman (born 1946), British historian
- Dr. Philip K. Chapman (1935–2021), Australian-born American astronaut
- Dr. Steve Chapman (born 1959), British university principal
