= Chaminade =

Chaminade can refer to:

== People ==
- William Joseph Chaminade (1761–1850), Catholic priest and founder of the Society of Mary (Marianists)
- Cécile Chaminade (1857–1944), French composer and pianist

== Organisations ==
- Educational institutions associated with the Marianists and named for William Joseph Chaminade:
  - Chaminade University of Honolulu
    - Chaminade Silverswords, the athletic program of Chaminade University
  - Chaminade High School in Mineola, New York
  - Chaminade College Preparatory School (California) in Chatsworth and West Hills, California
  - Chaminade College Preparatory School (Missouri) in St. Louis, Missouri
  - Chaminade-Julienne High School in Dayton, Ohio
  - Chaminade-Madonna College Preparatory School in Hollywood, Florida
  - Chaminade College School, in Toronto, Canada

== Other uses ==
- Chaminade Resort & Spa, located in former Marianist institution in Santa Cruz, California
