= John Stuart Archer =

Vice-Chancellorof Heriot-Watt University (1943–2007)

John Stuart Archer CBE FRSE

Principal of Heriot-Watt University
- In office 1997–2006
- Preceded by: Alistair MacFarlane
- Succeeded by: Anton Muscatelli

John Stuart Archer CBE FRSE FREng (15 June 1943 – 9 December 2007) was vice-chancellor and principal of Heriot-Watt University from 1997 to 2006.

== Life ==
Archer was born in London on 15 June 1943 and went to Chiswick County Grammar School. He obtained a BSc in Industrial chemistry from City University London in 1965 and a PhD from Imperial College London. In 1969 he emigrated to Canada with his wife Lesley and got a job as a petroleum engineer. He returned to the UK in 1973, and worked in the European gas fields.

He entered academia as a reader in petroleum engineering at Imperial College in 1980, becoming a professor in 1986, then head of the Department of Mineral Resources Engineering in 1987. After further senior positions at Imperial College, including two years as dean of the Royal School of Mines in 1989–91, he joined Heriot-Watt University in 1997 as vice-chancellor and principal, until his retirement in July 2006. He died 9 December 2007 of cancer, survived by his wife and their son and daughter (the sociologist Professor Louise Archer).

== Honours and professional affiliations ==
Archer was appointed a CBE in 2002 for services to higher education. He was a fellow of the Royal Academy of Engineering and of the Royal Society of Edinburgh. He served as president of the Institution of Chemical Engineers for 2005–2006, which included responsibility for the World Congress in Chemical Engineering, held in Glasgow in 2005. He received honorary degrees from the University of Edinburgh, Imperial College, City University and Heriot-Watt University.
