= Pamela Gillies =

Former Principal of Glasgow Caledonian University

Pamela Gillies CBE FRSA FAcSS FRSE
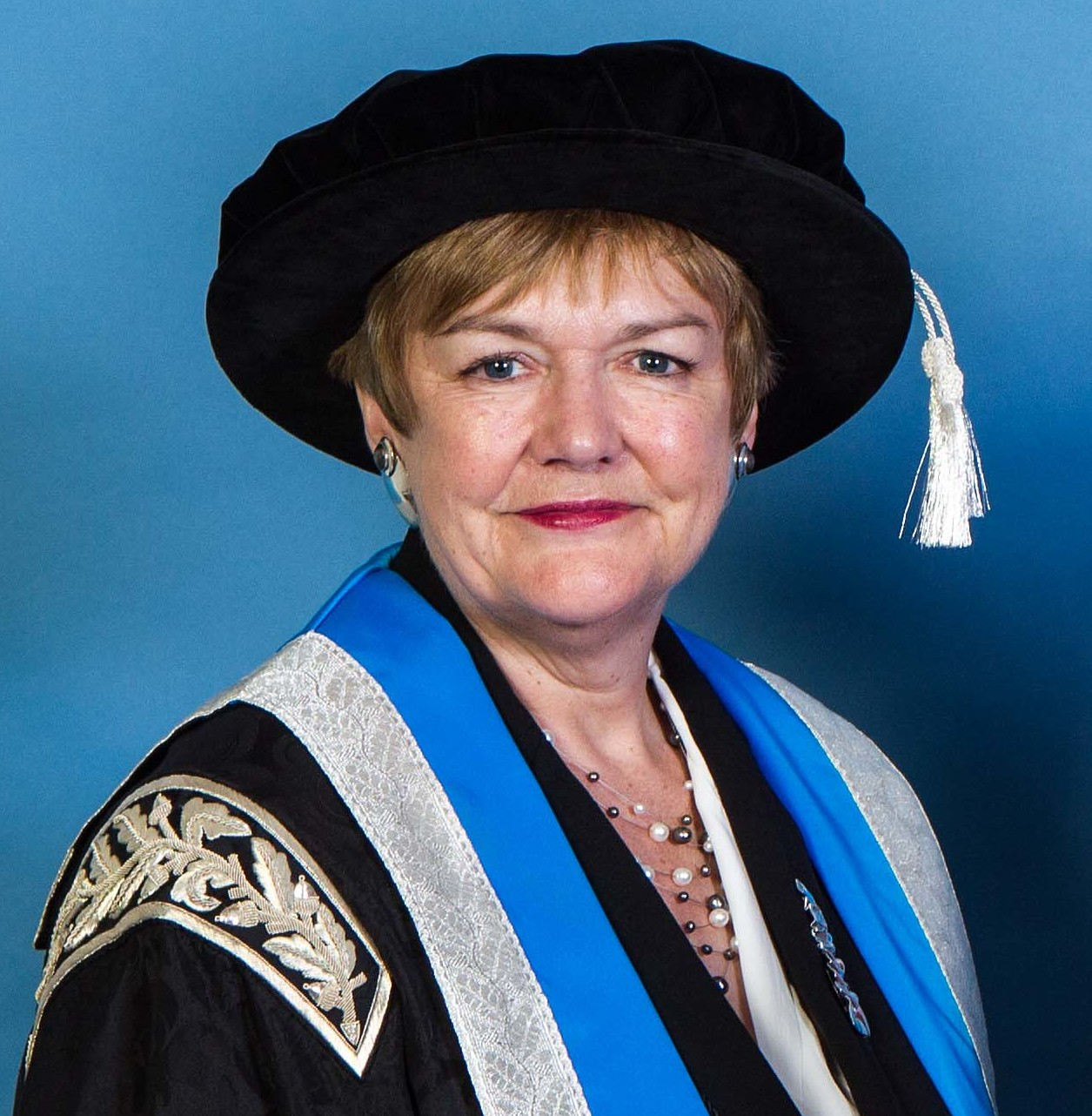
- Professor Gillies in 2014

Principal and Vice-Chancellor of Glasgow Caledonian University
- In office March 2006 – January 2023
- Preceded by: Ian Johnston
- Succeeded by: Steve Decent

Personal details
- Born: 1953 (age 72–73)
- Education: University of Aberdeen; University of Nottingham
- Occupation: Epidemiologist, academic, educator

Professor Pamela Gillies CBE FRSA FAcSS FRSE (born 1953) is a Scottish academic and educator who served as Principal and Vice-Chancellor of Glasgow Caledonian University from March 2006 until January 2023.

== Education ==
The first in her family to go to university, Gillies attended the University of Aberdeen, graduating in 1976 with a BSc in Physiology, a PGCE and a Masters in Education and Philosophy. In 1976 she was awarded a competitive Scottish Home and Health Department Fellowship to train in community health in England. She graduated first with an MMedSci and then subsequently with a PhD in Epidemiology from the University of Nottingham.

== Career ==
Gillies began her research career in 1978 as a research officer with the Department of Education in Sheffield evaluating health promotion initiatives. She moved back to Nottingham in 1984 to take up a lectureship in Public Health Medicine. She first became a Senior Lecturer, Professor of Public Health and Head of the School of Community Health Sciences before being promoted to a Pro Vice-Chancellor of the University of Nottingham in 2001.

During her career, Pamela Gillies has worked in San Francisco on an Abbott Fellowship for AIDS Research (1988), in Geneva at the World Health Organization's Global Programme on AIDS (1989), at Harvard as a Harkness Fellow and Visiting Professor in Health and Human Rights (1992–93), and in London on a seconded post as the first Executive Director of Research at the Health Education Authority for England (1996–99).

Gillies is a fellow of the Royal Society of Arts and was elected a Fellow of the Faculty of Public Health, Royal College of Physicians of London in 2002. Consequently, Gillies was appointed as an Academician of the Academy of Social Sciences in 2005. Finally, in March 2015, Gillies was elected a Fellow of the Royal Society of Edinburgh.

Amongst other roles, Gillies has served on ESRC Committees on Evidence Based Policy and on People at the Centre of Information and Communication Technologies. She has acted as Chair of the Peckam Pulse Healthy Living Centre, the Government's Task Force on Unintended Conceptions in Young People, and the European Commission's Working Group on HIV/AIDS, Human Rights and Discrimination.

Gillies has researched and written widely on cross-cultural perspectives on HIV/AIDS, sexuality and health, partnership responses to health improvement and community development responses to inequalities in health, focusing on the potential of social action for health. She was involved in a Gates Foundation funded research project in Kolkata, India, to prevent HIV transmission in sex workers and their families.

Gillies was installed as Principal and Vice-Chancellor of Glasgow Caledonian University in March 2006 after a career in higher education. She was appointed Commander of the Order of the British Empire (CBE) in the 2013 New Year Honours for services to education and public health. After seventeen years as Vice-Chancellor, she stepped down from the position in 2022.

Academic offices
Preceded by Ian Johnston	Principal and Vice-Chancellor of Glasgow Caledonian University; March 2006 – January 2023	Succeeded by Steve Decent
