= Alistair MacFarlane =

Scottish electrical engineer (1931–2021)

Sir Alistair MacFarlane CBE FREng FRS FRSE

Principal of Heriot-Watt University
- In office 1989–1996
- Preceded by: Thomas L. Johnston
- Succeeded by: John Stuart Archer

Personal details
- Born: Alistair George James MacFarlane; 9 May 1931
- Died: 2 November 2021 (aged 90)

Sir Alistair George James MacFarlane CBE FREng FRS FRSE (9 May 1931 – 2 November 2021) was a Scottish electrical engineer and leading academic who served as Principal and Vice Chancellor of Heriot-Watt University, Edinburgh, and Rector, University of the Highlands and Islands.

== Early career ==
Born on 9 May 1931, MacFarlane was educated at the former Hamilton Academy.

He continued his studies at the University of Glasgow from which he graduated BSc and was (thereafter awarded DSc), the University of London, PhD and the University of Manchester, MSc.

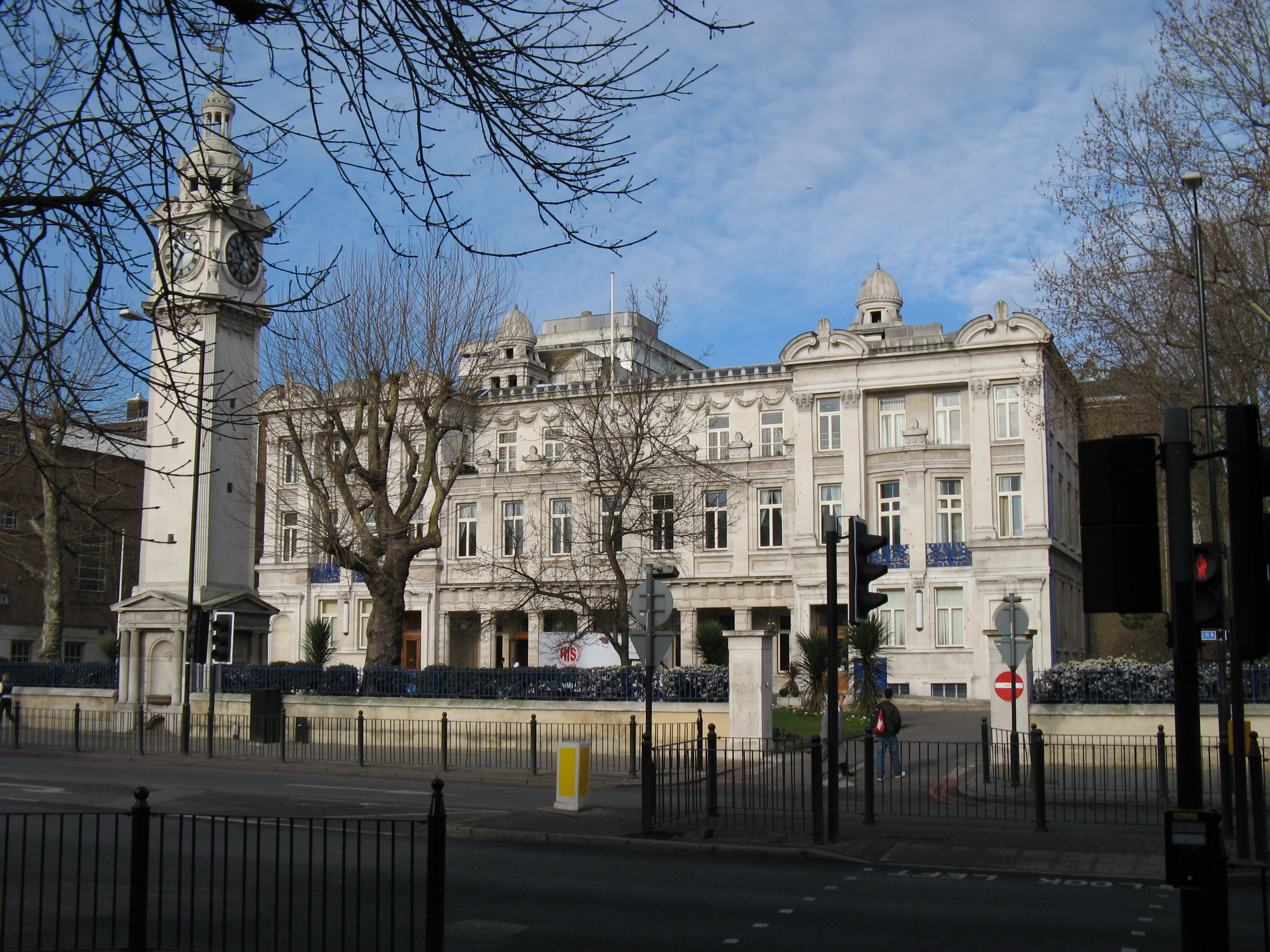
The Queen's Building, Queen Mary College, University of London

Following working as an engineer with the laboratories of the Metropolitan-Vickers Electrical Company Ltd., in 1959 MacFarlane was appointed Lecturer, Electrical Engineering, at Queen Mary College, University of London; promoted to Reader in 1965.

Transferring to University of Manchester Institute of Science and Technology in 1966 as Reader in Control Engineering, he was appointed Professor in 1969. Moving on to the University of Cambridge, MacFarlane was there appointed Professor of Control Engineering (1974–1990) and served as Head, Information Engineering Division, and Fellow, Selwyn College, Cambridge, 1974–78, and as Vice-Master, 1980–88. He was an Honorary Fellow of the college from 1978.

== Later career ==
From 1993 to 1998, MacFarlane served as chairman, Scottish Council for Research in Education and as chairman, Scottish Library and Information Council, 1994–98. Other appointments have included, non-Executive Directorship, British Nuclear Fuels (1994–2000); Member, BT Advisory Forum in Scotland, 1996–98; Consultant Editor, International Journal of Control and Membership of the Science and Engineering Research Council Computer Board, Joint Policy Committee for National Facilities for Advanced Research Computing, Advisory Committee on Safety of Nuclear Installations.

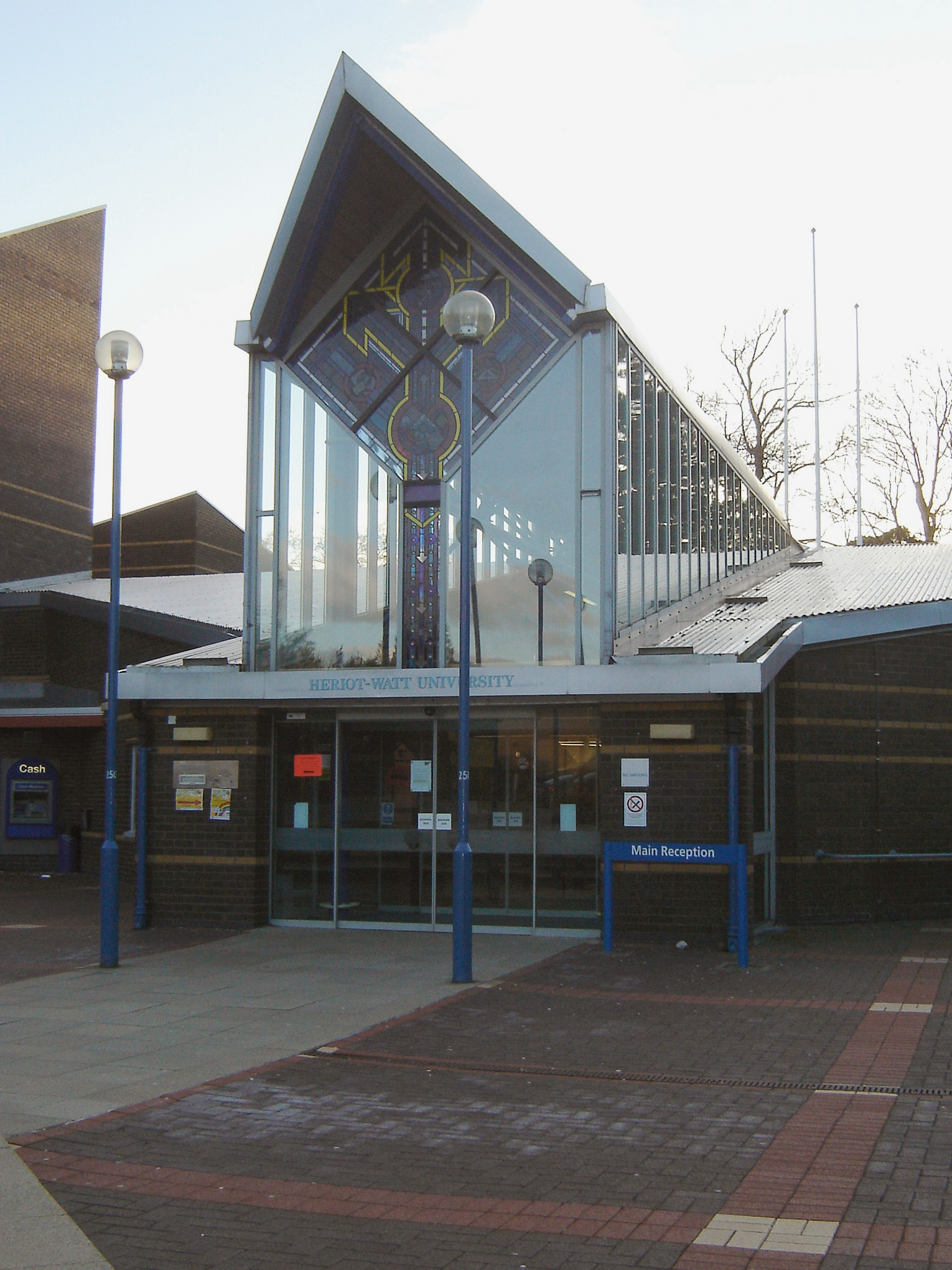
Entrance to main reception, Edinburgh Campus, Heriot-Watt University

From 1989 to 1996, MacFarlane served as Principal and Vice Chancellor, Heriot-Watt University, Edinburgh and from 1998 to 2000 as Chairman of the Advisory Group for the Scottish University for Industry. Appointed Chairman of the Academic Advisory Board, University of the Highlands and Islands Project (1999–2002), Macfarlane also served as Acting Chief Executive Officer (2000–01) and as Rector, University of the Highlands and Islands, from 2001 to 2004.

He died on 2 November 2021.

== Honours and awards ==
MacFarlane was appointed CBE in 1987 and served as vice-president of the Royal Society from 1997 to 1999, and was a Fellow of the Royal Society of Edinburgh; Fellow, Institution of Electrical Engineers; and Fellow of the Royal Academy of Engineering. He was awarded the American Society of Mechanical Engineers Centennial Medal, in 1980; Sir Harold Hartley Medal, Institute of Measurement and Control, in 1982; Institution of Electrical Engineers Achievement Medal, in 1992, and its Faraday Medal, in 1993 and the American Society of Mechanical Engineers Oldenburger Medal, in 2004. In 1998 Professor MacFarlane was appointed an Honorary Member of the Chartered Institute of Library and Information Professionals in Scotland.

MacFarlane was invested with a knighthood in 2002, for services to education and science.
