= Thomas L. Johnston =

Scottish economist (1927–2009)

Thomas Lothian Johnston FRSE

Principal of Heriot-Watt University
- In office 1981–1988
- Preceded by: George Murray Burnett
- Succeeded by: Alistair MacFarlane

Thomas Lothian Johnston FRSE (9 March 1927 in Whitburn, West Lothian – 2009 in Edinburgh) was a Scottish economist. He was professor of Economics at Heriot-Watt University in 1966–1976. He was the President of the Royal Society of Edinburgh in 1993–1996. In 1985 Johnston was elected a Foreign Member of the Royal Swedish Academy of Engineering Sciences.

Johnston was the Principal of Heriot-Watt University from 1981 to 1988 and received an Honorary Doctorate from the university in 1989.
