= Michael Vernace =

Canadian ice hockey player (born 1986)

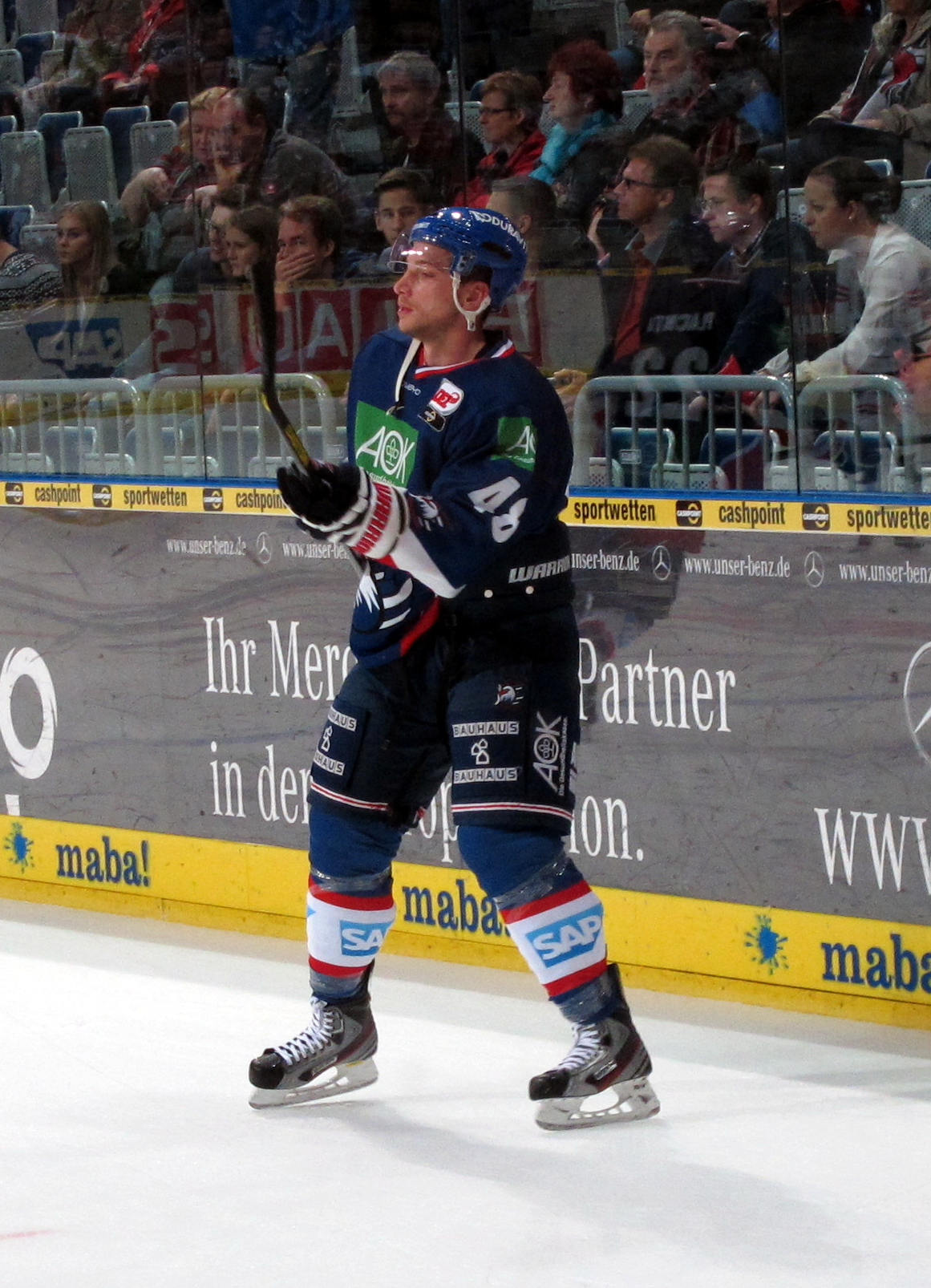
- Born: May 26, 1986 (age 40) Toronto, Ontario, Canada
- Height: 6 ft 2 in (188 cm)
- Weight: 200 lb (91 kg; 14 st 4 lb)
- Position: Defence
- Shot: Left
- Played for: Colorado Avalanche; Tampa Bay Lightning; Adler Mannheim; Rögle BK; Alba Volán Székesfehérvár; Rungsted Seier Capital
- NHL draft: 201st overall, 2004; San Jose Sharks
- Playing career: 2006–2018

Michael Vernace (born May 26, 1986) is a Canadian former professional ice hockey defenseman. He played in the National Hockey League (NHL) with the Colorado Avalanche and the Tampa Bay Lightning.

== Playing career ==
Born in Toronto, Ontario, Vernace grew up playing most of his minor hockey in the Greater Toronto Hockey League, finishing his minor career with the 2001–02 Mississauga Reps Bantams. After that season, Vernace was a 9th round choice (163rd overall) in the 2001 OHL Priority Selection by the Brampton Battalion.

The following season, Vernace was assigned by the Battalion to the OHA Jr.A. Bramalea Blues.

Vernace was drafted 201st overall by the San Jose Sharks in the 2004 NHL entry draft from the Brampton Battalion of the Ontario Hockey League. He attended Chaminade College School for his high school education.

On June 1, 2006, Vernace was traded by the Sharks to the Colorado Avalanche for a 6th round drafts pick and was signed to an entry-level contract. Vernace made his professional debut with the Arizona Sundogs of the CHL before joining the Avalanche's affiliate the Albany River Rats of the AHL in the 2006–07 season.

Vernace joined new Avalanche affiliate, the Lake Erie Monsters, for their inaugural season in the 2007–08 season, leading the Monsters in games played with 79. After spending the majority of the 2008–09 season with the Monsters, Vernace received his first NHL call-up on March 16, 2009. He made his NHL debut with the Avalanche in a 3–2 shootout loss to the Minnesota Wild on March 17, 2009.

After not being offered a contract with the Avalanche, Vernace a free agent, signed a one-year deal with the Atlanta Thrashers on July 30, 2009. On September 26, 2009, Vernace was assigned to AHL affiliate, the Chicago Wolves, for the beginning of the 2009–10 season. After 47 games with the Wolves, Vernace was then reassigned to the Hamilton Bulldogs on March 10, 2010. He recorded 4 assists in 18 post season games to help the Bulldogs reach the Western Conference finals.

On June 23, 2010, Vernace was traded by the Thrashers, along with Brett Sterling and a 7th round selection in 2010 NHL entry draft, back to the Sharks for future considerations in order to help the Thrashers facilitate an earlier trade of Dustin Byfuglien from the Chicago Blackhawks.

Unable to come to terms with San Jose, Vernace signed as a free agent with the Tampa Bay Lightning on July 29, 2010, to a one-year, two-way contract.

In the 2011–12 season, on December 2, 2011, Vernace was traded by the Lightning, along with James Wright, to the Florida Panthers for Mike Kostka and Evan Oberg. Assigned to AHL affiliate, the San Antonio Rampage, his tenure was short lived when on February 25, 2012, Vernace was traded by the Panthers to the New York Rangers, along with a third round pick in the 2013 NHL entry draft, for Wojtek Wolski, Vernace's former teammate from the Brampton Battalion.

After two seasons within the Rangers organization, Vernace left as a free agent to sign his first European contract in Germany on a one-year deal with Adler Mannheim of the Deutsche Eishockey Liga on August 8, 2013. After 18 points in 51 games with Mannheim, Vernace belatedly signed in the Swedish second division the following season, signing for the remainder of the 2014–15 season with Rögle BK on December 11, 2014.

Vernace played two seasons in Europe, before opting for a return to North America and with the 2015–16 season underway, signed a contract with the Brampton Beast of the ECHL on October 28, 2015.

== Career statistics ==
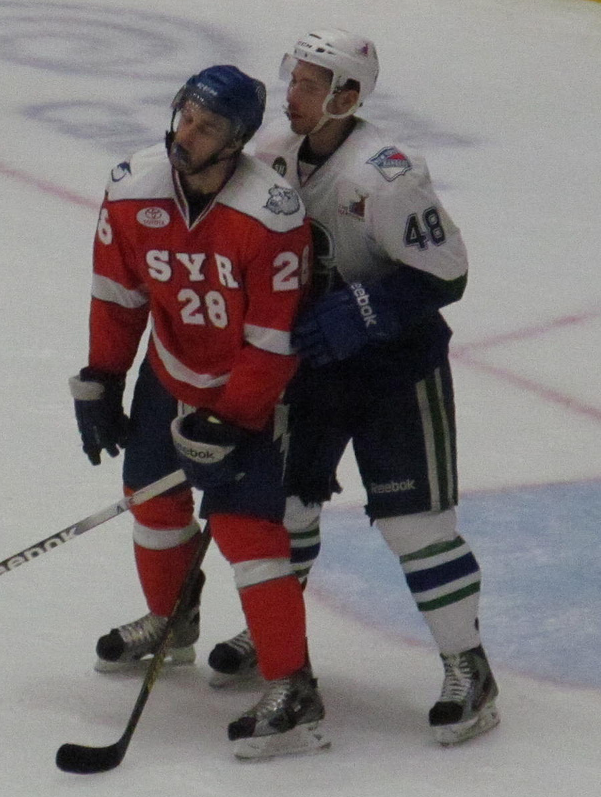
Vernace (right) while with the Connecticut Whale, defending against Brett Connolly (left)

			Regular season					Playoffs
Season	Team	League	GP	G	A	Pts	PIM	GP	G	A	Pts	PIM
2002–03	Mississauga Reps 18U AAA	GTHL	38	13	27	40	28	—	—	—	—	—
2003–04	Bramalea Blues	OPJHL	33	3	12	15	16	—	—	—	—	—
2003–04	Brampton Battalion	OHL	2	1	1	2	0	11	2	3	5	8
2004–05	Brampton Battalion	OHL	68	12	38	50	42	6	2	2	4	0
2005–06	Brampton Battalion	OHL	68	10	62	72	54	11	1	5	6	6
2006–07	Arizona Sundogs	CHL	24	3	11	14	20	—	—	—	—	—
2006–07	Albany River Rats	AHL	30	1	11	12	35	—	—	—	—	—
2007–08	Lake Erie Monsters	AHL	79	3	26	29	59	—	—	—	—	—
2008–09	Lake Erie Monsters	AHL	65	3	14	17	52	—	—	—	—	—
2008–09	Colorado Avalanche	NHL	12	0	0	0	8	—	—	—	—	—
2009–10	Chicago Wolves	AHL	47	2	10	12	29	—	—	—	—	—
2009–10	Hamilton Bulldogs	AHL	15	0	1	1	23	18	0	4	4	8
2010–11	Tampa Bay Lightning	NHL	10	0	1	1	2	—	—	—	—	—
2010–11	Norfolk Admirals	AHL	68	7	21	28	60	6	0	2	2	8
2011–12	Norfolk Admirals	AHL	22	2	10	12	23	—	—	—	—	—
2011–12	San Antonio Rampage	AHL	22	0	4	4	7	—	—	—	—	—
2011–12	Connecticut Whale	AHL	21	1	1	2	20	9	0	2	2	0
2012–13	Connecticut Whale	AHL	69	8	27	35	51	—	—	—	—	—
2013–14	Adler Mannheim	DEL	51	1	17	18	34	4	0	0	0	2
2014–15	Rögle BK	Allsv	18	1	3	4	44	7	0	0	0	2
2015–16	Brampton Beast	ECHL	56	5	31	36	117	—	—	—	—	—
2015–16	Stockton Heat	AHL	5	0	0	0	2	—	—	—	—	—
2016–17	Brampton Beast	ECHL	23	2	11	13	12	—	—	—	—	—
2016–17	Fehérvár AV19	AUT	14	2	3	5	10	—	—	—	—	—
2017–18	Rungsted Seier Capital	DEN	48	6	12	18	74	14	1	3	4	41
AHL totals			443	27	125	152	361	33	0	8	8	16
NHL totals			22	0	1	1	10	—	—	—	—	—

== Awards and honours ==
Award	Year
OHL
First All-Rookie Team	2004–05
