= Muhammad Ali Imran =

Pakistani-British professor of communication systems

Muhammad Ali Imran is a Pakistani-British academic and a Professor of Communication Systems at the University of Glasgow. He serves as Dean of Graduate Studies and Transnational Engineering Education at the James Watt School of Engineering and leads the Communications, Sensing and Imaging (CSI) research hub.

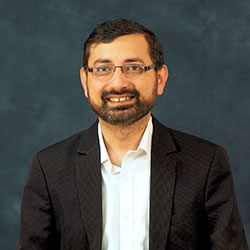
Muhammad Ali Imran

== Career ==
Imran has contributed to a range of research projects in wireless communication systems, including 5G and 6G networks. He has participated in major UK research programmes such as CHEDDAR and JOINER, which received over £40 million in UK government and UKRI funding to explore future communication systems.

His research also extends to digital health. Imran was involved in the development of a radar-based system for non-contact detection of heart sounds, which has been used in UK precision medicine research.

He has also worked on rural connectivity and frugal networking solutions, contributing to projects aimed at enhancing digital inclusion across the UK.

== Research and publications ==
Imran has authored or co-authored more than 500 research papers on wireless communication, energy-efficient networks, and digital health systems. His publications have received over 20,000 citations, with an h-index exceeding 60 according to Google Scholar.

== Public engagement ==
Imran has participated in public and industry discussions on next-generation wireless technologies. He took part in a Royal Academy of Engineering–hosted Q&A titled "What does 6G mean to you?" as part of the Free6GTraining initiative.

He has also given invited talks at international conferences and science communication forums, including one by India’s Department of Science and Technology on 5G and its future applications.

== Awards and honours ==
Imran is a Fellow of the Royal Society of Edinburgh (FRSE), a Fellow of the Institute of Electrical and Electronics Engineers (FIEEE), and a Fellow of the Institution of Engineering and Technology (FIET).
