= Steve Decent =

British mathematician and university administrator

Steve Decent FIMA

Vice Chancellor of Lancaster University
- Incumbent
- Assumed office 1 January 2026
- Preceded by: Andy Schofield

Principal and vice-chancellor of Glasgow Caledonian University
- In office January 2023 – December 2025
- Preceded by: Pamela Gillies
- Succeeded by: Mairi Watson

Personal details
- Education: Brunel University (BSc); University of St Andrews (PhD)

Academic background
- Thesis: Hysteresis and mode competition in Faraday waves (1995)

Stephen Paul Decent FIMA is a British applied mathematician and university administrator who has served as the Vice-Chancellor of Lancaster University since January 2026, having previously served as principal and vice-chancellor of Glasgow Caledonian University. He has previously held a number of senior leadership positions across different universities and holds research interests in free-surface flows and hydrogen fuel cells.

== Early life and education ==
The first member of his own family to go to university, Decent holds a BSc in mathematics from Brunel University and a PhD from the University of St Andrews. His doctoral thesis was on the theory of wave motion and was funded by the Engineering and Physical Sciences Research Council.

== Career ==
After completing his PhD, Decent joined the University of Birmingham as a research fellow and was eventually promoted to the head of the School of Mathematics. He then moved to the University of Dundee to take up the position of vice-principal and head of the College of Art, Science and Engineering. Afterwards, he joined Lancaster University as pro-vice-chancellor of research and enterprise and later pro-vice-chancellor of academic development before moving again to take up the position of provost and deputy vice-chancellor at Manchester Metropolitan University.

He was appointed as the vice-chancellor of Glasgow Caledonian University in January 2023. He returned to Lancaster in January 2026 to take up his next appointment as the university's vice-chancellor.

Academic offices
Preceded by Andy Schofield	Vice Chancellor of Lancaster University; January 2026–	Succeeded by Incumbent
Preceded by Pamela Gillies	Principal and Vice-Chancellor of Glasgow Caledonian University; January 2023–December 2025	Succeeded by Mairi Watson
