= Charles Preller =

German-born British engineer and amateur geologist

Dr Charles Sheibner du Riche Preller FRSE FRGS MIEE MICE (1844 – 17 February 1929 ) was a German-born British engineer and amateur geologist. He specialised in electric railways. He was fluent in English, French, German and Italian. He founded the Royal Society of Edinburgh's Bruce-Preller Lecture Prize in memory of his wife. He was Chairman and Chief Engineer of the Limmat Valley Electric Railway Company in Switzerland.

== Life ==
He was born Charles Sheibner in the Kingdom of Saxony in 1844 of French descent, but moved to Yorkshire (England) in his youth and was raised there, and was legally a British citizen. He was apprenticed as an engineer in Bradford.

He studied Engineering in Paris, Lyon and Dresden and Science in Yorkshire. He received doctorates from both Heidelberg (PhD) and Florence (DSc) and also did postgraduate studies in Leipzig.

Staying in Germany he was involved in the installation of one of the world's first electric railway systems in the Saxony district from 1872. He stayed in or around Dresden until 1878. In 1879 he began hydro-electric power projects in the Carrara Mountains in Italy. In 1891 he moved to Switzerland working on electric systems in the Zurich and St. Gallen cantons. He was also involved in the electrification of French lighthouses.

In 1892, he changed his name from Sheibner to Du Riche Preller, thereafter generally being known as Dr Preller.

He moved to Edinburgh in 1902 and in the same year was elected a Fellow of the Royal Society of Edinburgh (still under the name of Shreiber). His proposers were Andrew Beatson Bell, William Allan Carter, George Chrystal and John Macdonald, Lord Kingsburgh.

From around 1910, he began to concentrate on his geological interests, especially in the Italian Alps.

In 1914, he dropped the Germanic "Sheibner" from his name, due to anti-German feelings in the First World War.

He died in Edinburgh on 17 February 1929, aged 84. On his death he left funds and instructions regarding creation of the Bruce-Peller Lectures which began in 1931.

== Publications ==
- Italian Mountain Geology (1918 reprinted 1923)

== Family ==
In 1879, he was married to Rachel Steuart Bruce, daughter of Thomas Bruce of Langlee, a friend of Sir Walter Scott.

== Bruce-Preller Lectures ==
The biennial lecture is usually (but not exclusively) given by a Fellow of the Royal Society of London or Royal Society of Edinburgh. The lectures are given in a cycle: Earth Sciences: Engineering Sciences; Medical Sciences and Biological Sciences.

- 1931 – Edmund Taylor Whittaker – "James Clerk Maxwell"
- 1933 – C H Lander – "The Liquification of Coal"
- 1935 – William Lawrence Bragg – "The New Crystallography"
- 1937 – Hugh Stott Taylor – "Heavy hydrogen"
- 1939 – Patrick Blackett – "The Mesotron"
- 1941 – Sir Thomas Henry Holland – "The Evolution of Continents"
- 1943 – Harry Work Melville – "The Future of Synthetic Plastics"
- 1945 – Sydney Chapman – "The Earth's Magnetism"
- 1947 – G. M. B. Dobson – "Methods of Exploring in the Upper Atmosphere"
- 1949 – Sir Thomas Cockcroft – "New Tools of Nuclear Physics"
- 1951 – Edmund Langley Hirst – "The Synthesis and Function of Sugars in Plant life"
- 1953 – Sir Edward Bullard – "The Floor of the Ocean"
- 1955 – Charles Alfred Coulson – "The Role of Wave Mechanics in Chemistry"
- 1957 – Martin Ryle – "The Mullard Radio Astronomy Observatory"
- 1959 – Sir Richard Woolley – "Magellanic Clouds"
- 1961 – Victor Eyles – "The Life and Work of Sir James Hall"
- 1963 – Brian Pippard – "The Geometry of Conduction Electrons"
- 1965 – Sir John Baker – "The Design of Steel-Framed Structures"
- 1967 – J. J. Donner – "Late-Glacial and Post-Glacial Shorelines in Fenno-Scandia"
- 1969 – Denys Wilkinson – "Back to Socrates for a Terapound"
- 1971 – Sir George Porter – "Physical and Chemical Processes in Electronically Excited Molecules"
- 1973 – C. W. Oatley – "Electron-Optical Imaging Devices"
- 1975 – Sir Kingsley Dunham – "Geothermal Energy"
- 1977 – Sir Alan Cottrel – "Making the Most of Things"
- 1979 – John Frederick Dewey – "The Origin of Mountain Ranges"
- 1981 – John Edwin Midwinter – "The Success Story of Optical Communication"
- 1983 – Sir Peter Hirsch - "Materials Under the Microscope"
- 1985 – G. G. Roberts – "At Home with Science and Technology"
- 1987 – Sir John Meurig Thomas – "The Genius of Michael Faraday"

There was no lecture in 1989 or 1991 and the rhythm of the lectures changed due to a five year gap.

- 1992 – Philip Cohen – "The Role of Protein Phosphorylation in Cell Regulation and Human Disease"
- 1994 – George H. Denton – "What Drives Glacial Cycles?"
- 1996 – Colin R. McInnes – "Setting Sail for Orbit: Solar Sail Spacecraft"
- 1998 – David Philip Lane – "The P53 Tumour Suppressor Gene"
- 2000 – Adrian Bird – "The Epigenetics of Disease"
- 2002 – Sir Keith O'Nions – "The Threat of Terrorism"
- 2004 – Jason Reese – "Disturbing the Equilibrium: The Challenge of Extreme Fluid Dynamics"
- 2006 – David Porteous – "Our Genetic Inheritance"
