= Anton Muscatelli =

Scottish economist (born 1962)

Sir Anton Muscatelli FRSA FRSE FAcSS

President of the Royal Society of Edinburgh
- Incumbent
- Assumed office April 2025

Principal and Vice-Chancellor of the University of Glasgow
- In office October 2009 – September 2025
- Preceded by: Sir Muir Russell
- Succeeded by: Andy Schofield

Personal details
- Born: 1 January 1962 (age 64) Bari, Italy
- Education: University of Glasgow (MA, PhD)

Academic background
- Thesis: Feedback and Forward-Looking Models of the Demand for Money: The Case of the United Kingdom, 1963–86 (1989)

Sir Vito Antonio Muscatelli FRSA FRSE FAcSS (born 1 January 1962) is the President of the Royal Society of Edinburgh and former Principal of the University of Glasgow.

== Early life ==
Anton Muscatelli was born on 1 January 1962 in Bari, Italy to Ambrogio and Rosellina Muscatelli. He lived in Mola di Bari in his early years. His father, who was head of a shipping company, relocated the family to Glasgow from the Netherlands. Anton was educated at The High School of Glasgow and the University of Glasgow, where he graduated M.A. (Hons) in Political Economy (1984) and took a PhD in Economics (1989). He was a Lecturer, Senior Lecturer and Professor at the University of Glasgow from 1984 to 1994, and Daniel Jack Professor of Political Economy from 1994 until 2007. He was Dean of the Faculty of Social Sciences, 2000 to 2004, and Vice-Principal (Strategy, Budgeting and Advancement) from 2004 until 2007.

== Career ==
- 1980–84 – MA (Hons) Political Economy, University of Glasgow.
- 1984–87 – PhD Political Economy, University of Glasgow.
- 1984–90 – Lecturer in the Department of Political Economy, University of Glasgow.
- 1990–92 – Senior Lecturer in the Department of Political Economy, University of Glasgow.
- 1992–94 – Professor in Economics, University of Glasgow
- 1994–2007 – Daniel Jack Professor of Political Economy, University of Glasgow.
- 1995–2000 – Head of the Department of Economics, University of Glasgow.
- 2000–2004 – Dean of the Faculty of Social Sciences, University of Glasgow.
- 2004–2007 – Vice-Principal (Strategy, Budgeting and Advancement), University of Glasgow.
- 2007–2009 – Principal and Vice-Chancellor, Heriot Watt University.
- 2009–2025 – Principal and Vice-Chancellor, University of Glasgow.
- 2017–2020 – Chair of the Russell Group.
- President of the Royal Society of Edinburgh.

Muscatelli has been a consultant to the World Bank and the European Commission, and was a member of the Panel of Economic Advisers of the Secretary of State for Scotland from 1998 to 2000. From 2007–2010, he was an adviser to the House of Commons Treasury Select Committee on monetary policy, and in 2008 he was appointed to chair an independent expert group for the Calman Commission on Devolution, set up by the Scottish Parliament and UK Government and led by the chancellor of the University of Glasgow, Sir Kenneth Calman. This included experts from the UK, Europe, and North America. The Muscatelli expert group set out a number of principles which funding of devolved government in Scotland should follow. These were adopted by the Calman Commission and were embedded into the fiscal devolution provisions in the Scotland Act (2012). Following the Smith Commission reforms to fiscal devolution which led to the Scotland Act (2016), there was considerable debate and controversy around the adjustment to the block grant to Scotland from the UK exchequer. Muscatelli argued for the need to compromise between the Scottish and UK Government positions on how block grant adjustment should be formulated. A deal between the UK and Scottish Governments was announced on 23 February 2016.

Between 2015–2021 he was a member of the Council of Economic Advisers of the First Minister of Scotland. In June 2016, following the vote in the UK EU Referendum, he was appointed by the First Minister of Scotland to chair the Standing Council on Europe, an advisory group to advise ministers on how best to protect Scotland's relationship with the EU, which he chaired until 2021. During the period as Chair of the First Minister's Standing Council on Europe, which was created to advise Scottish Government on Brexit he argued strongly that the UK should seek to maintain a strong relationship with Europe, including maintaining membership of the Single Market through EFTA/EEA membership. In October 2018 at a Summit hosted by Glasgow City Council he warned about the economic damage of Brexit and called the UK's exit from the EU as “the most unhinged example of national self-sabotage in living memory.” In 2017 he outlined the potential impact on the UK from Brexit in a Policy Scotland Lecture. He is a member of the Productivity Commission which is the policy arm of The Productivity Institute, which was established in 2021 by the Economic and Social Research Council in Manchester, and regularly meets to discuss ongoing policy questions regarding productivity throughout the UK.

He chaired the Research and Commercialisation Committee of Universities Scotland in 2007–08 and from 2008 to 2010 was convener of Universities Scotland and vice-president of Universities UK. Between 2012-13 he co-chaired a review with Richard Lambert which led to the establishment of the National Centre for Universities and Business (NCUB). He was a Director of NCUB until 2015. He was appointed a Fellow of the Royal Society of Edinburgh in 2001, and of the CESifo Economics Research Institute in Munich in 1999. In 2009 he was appointed Knight Commander (Commendatore) of the Republic of Italy for services to economics and higher education. In 2012 he was awarded an honorary doctorate (Ll.D) from McGill University, Montreal, Canada. Between 2012 and 2018 he was a member of the board of the Scottish Funding Council (SFC), which provides funding and oversight of all of Scotland's colleges and universities. From 2014-18 he was Honorary President of the David Hume Institute, succeeding Lord David Steel. In 2015-16 he was a member of the Review of the UK Research Excellence Framework chaired by Nicholas Stern. In 2019 he was commissioned by the Scottish Government to write a report on Scotland's Research and Innovation Landscape, and the Muscatelli Report was published in November 2019. In 2022 he was appointed by the UK Government's Department for Business, Energy and Industrial Strategy to be a member of the scoping group as part of the Review of the UK Research, Development and Innovation system led by Paul Nurse. He has held visiting appointments in many universities, including, in 2014, guest professor of Nankai University, Tianjin, China. Muscatelli was chair of the Russell Group from 2017 to 2020.

He was knighted in the 2017 Birthday Honours for services to economics and higher education.

=== Heriot-Watt University ===
Anton Muscatelli was appointed principal of Heriot-Watt University on 10 October 2006, with effect from 1 February 2007. He replaced John Archer, who retired. His tenure as principal saw expansion in the University and rises in league tables. He was described by The Herald in 2008 as "one of the leading lights in Scottish higher education". Upon the announcement that he would be moving to Glasgow, the chairman of the Court of Heriot-Watt, Lord Penrose, said: "Professor Muscatelli has been an excellent principal and vice-chancellor for Heriot-Watt University. During his time here, he has led the university to an ambitious strategy which will be our foundation for the future."

Muscatelli was succeeded as principal of Heriot-Watt on 1 September 2009 by Steve Chapman, formerly a vice-principal at the University of Edinburgh.

=== University of Glasgow ===
Professor Muscatelli succeeded Sir Muir Russell as principal and vice-chancellor of the University of Glasgow in October 2009. One of his first actions was creation of a post of senior vice-principal, with responsibility for internationalisation, a key aspect of his strategy for the university. He also put forward proposals to the University Court to restructure the university's nine faculties into four colleges: College of Arts, College of Medical, Veterinary and Life Sciences, College of Science and Engineering and College of Social Sciences. Such structures already existed, or have since been adopted, at other large universities in the UK, including Birmingham, Manchester and Edinburgh. The plans for restructuring were approved and brought into effect in August 2010. At the same time, the university's new strategy was unveiled entitled 'Glasgow 2020: A Global Vision'. In the last 13 years under Muscatelli's leadership, the University of Glasgow has risen rapidly in world university rankings, and is now in the top 100 universities in the world according to the Times Higher Education and QS University rankings. Glasgow University has also become increasingly popular with international students as a result of the greater focus on international links, with demand for Glasgow University places more than doubling since 2009. Glasgow now has more than 11,000 international students on its Scottish campuses. The University of Glasgow has also improved its research quality, as assessed by the UK Research Excellence Framework (REF). In the latest 2021 REF exercise, the University of Glasgow was ranked in the top 10 in the Russell Group, and the top University in Scotland. Since 2010, the university has also increased its international reach, launching several new transnational education programmes in Singapore, with Singapore Institute of Technology, and in China, with a joint school of engineering being launched with UESTC in Chengdu in 2013. Professor Muscatelli retired from his post as Principal and Vice-Chancellor in 2025 after 16 years in the post.

== Research work ==
Anton Muscatelli's research work has focused on different areas of monetary economics and central bank independence, macroeconomics, and applied econometrics. His early work focused on the demand for money in the economy and how monetary aggregates could be used to design monetary policy. As part of this work he examined long-term trends in monetary policy. An example of this work is his Journal of Monetary Economics article in 2000. The historical data in this work is used in comparative historical studies in monetary economics. His most cited work examines the behaviour of central banks under inflation targeting. In his Economic Journal article in 1998 he argued that if monetary policy is delegated to a central bank whose preferences are uncertain, an optimal policy design based on Walsh-type optimal contracts or inflation targets is unlikely to be superior to Rogoff-type conservatism. It also highlighted the fact that announcements by central banks might reveal private information about the bank's goals or the state of the economy. One further implication of this uncertainty is that it may be better in some circumstances to allow the central bank to set its own inflation target rather than setting a fixed mandate. In empirical work with Alex Cukierman he showed that central banks may exhibit asymmetric control over inflation and output, and particularly that during the Greenspan era there was evidence that the United States Federal Reserve tried to protect the economy against downward swings in economic activity. This was one of the first papers to provide evidence of 'recession avoidance' and non-linear interest rate responses by central banks and has led to a number of papers in this area.

Another strand of Muscatelli's work has focused on the design of fiscal policy when government decisions interface with independent central banks, and why political instability might result in lower than optimal public investment. In related work on fiscal consolidations in devolved and federal fiscal arrangements, Muscatelli (together with Julia Darby and Graeme Roy) analyses how different tiers of government interact strategically through the setting of central government grants, which are an important channel through which central government exercises control on public expenditure in local and regional government.

Muscatelli's empirical work spans a wide range of topics, including using industry-level data to verify the empirical fit of Dynamic Stochastic General Equilibrium (DSGE) models in macroeconomics. In one study based on US manufacturing industry data, Muscatelli (with James Malley and Ulrich Woitek) finds evidence using Vector Autoregression (VAR) models which favours a sticky-wage or Real Business Cycle interpretation to a sticky-price model in these DSGE models. In another series of papers, Muscatelli and co-authors propose estimating trade flow models by taking both supply and demand factors into account to ensure more consistent estimates of demand elasticities.

In a recent book chapter, Muscatelli provides a survey of how economists have analyzed the relationship between economic forces and constitutional norms, including the role of political processes. It draws on the recent literature on public choice, the new political economy, and constitutional economics, to examine the factors which determine the two-way causal relationship between constitutional norms, including electoral processes, and economic policies and economic performance. Muscatelli also co-authored a textbook, Macroeconomic Theory and Stabilization Policy (with Andrew Stevenson and Mary Gregory) which was used extensively in advanced undergraduate and graduate economics programmes, and two edited volumes.

== Personal life ==
Muscatelli married Elaine Flood in 1986, with whom he has a son and a daughter. His interests include music, literature, football, strategic games and cookery.

== Arms ==
Coat of arms of Anton Muscatelli
Crest A dexter hand holding in its palm a terrestrial globe Proper. Escutcheon Azure two lions combatant Or holding between their dexter paws an open book Proper on a chief enarched two olive trees Proper. Motto Quaerimus Litoribus Nova Et Discimus

== See also ==
- Commission on Scottish Devolution
- Heriot-Watt University
- University of Glasgow
- Mola di Bari

Academic offices
Preceded by John Archer	Principal of Heriot-Watt University; 1 February 2007–1 September 2009	Succeeded by Steve Chapman
Preceded by Sir Muir Russell	Vice-Chancellor and Principal of the University of Glasgow; 1 October 2009–30 September 2025	Succeeded by Andy Schofield
