= Michael Lombardi (entrepreneur) =

Canadian entrepreneur

- Born: 1964 (age 61–62); Toronto, Canada
- Education: MBA, Edinburgh Business School, Heriot-Watt University, Edinburgh, Scotland
- Occupations: Entrepreneur, investor, publisher and author
- Organization: Lombardi's Alpha Corporation

Michael Lombardi (born 1964) is a Canadian-born entrepreneur, investor, publisher and author.

He is the CEO of Lombardi's Alpha Corporation (formerly Lombardi Media Corporation), a holding company that owns a group of businesses concentrated in publishing, digital media, customer contact services, consumer goods, direct marketing and product fulfillment. Lombardi has been listed in Who's Who in Canadian Business.

== Early life ==
Lombardi was born in Toronto in 1964. He attended Chaminade College before attending York University and later received his MBA from the Graduate Business School, Heriot-Watt University, Edinburgh, Scotland. In 1986, he founded Lombardi Publishing Corporation.

== Career ==
Lombardi Publishing Corporation experienced rapid growth in the 2000s and was ranked several times as one of Canada's 100 fastest growing companies by Profit Magazine.

In the late 1990s, through his holding company, Lombardi started acquiring companies that supplied the Canadian direct marketing industry. Lombardi purchased Anvon Sale Tech Inc. and Templeman Direct Marketing Limited, two major suppliers to the Canadian direct marketing industry. The companies where merged into Clixx Direct Marketing Services Inc. which Lombardi eventually sold in 2010 to NYSE listed Cenveo Inc. In 2007, Lombardi's Alpha Corporation made its first acquisition in the U.S. direct marketing industry.

Lombardi's Alpha Corporation became a public company in 1993 via a reverse-takeover of Golden Point Exploration Inc. In 2007, Lombardi, who was then the major shareholder of Lombardi's Alpha Corporation with approximately 89% of the outstanding stock, purchased the remaining shares in a going-private transaction.
