= Mark Smith (physicist) =

British physicist, academic and academic administrator

Mark Smith CBE FInstP

President and Vice Chancellor of the University of Southampton
- In office 1 October 2019 – May 2026
- Preceded by: Christopher Snowden
- Succeeded by: Charlie Jeffery

Vice Chancellor of Lancaster University
- In office 1 January 2012 – 30 September 2019
- Preceded by: Paul Wellings
- Succeeded by: Andy Schofield

Personal details
- Born: March 1963 (age 63) Suffolk, United Kingdom
- Education: University of Cambridge (BA); University of Warwick (PhD)
- Awards: Fellow of the Institute of Physics
- Scientific career
- Fields: Materials physics
- Workplaces: Commonwealth Scientific and Industrial Research Organisation; University of Kent; University of Warwick; Lancaster University
- Thesis: A High Resolution Multinuclear Magnetic Resonance Study of Ceramic Phases (1987)

Mark Edmund Smith, CBE, FInstP (born March 1963) is a British physicist, academic, and academic administrator. He specialises in nuclear magnetic resonance (NMR) and materials physics. Since June 2026, he has been a Pro Vice-Chancellor at the University of Oxford, having previously been the President and Vice-Chancellor of University of Southampton. He has previously lectured at the University of Kent and the University of Warwick.

== Early life and education ==
Smith was born and brought up in Suffolk, England. He studied natural sciences at Churchill College, Cambridge, and graduated from the University of Cambridge with a Bachelor of Arts (BA) degree. He undertook postgraduate research in physics at the University of Warwick, graduating with a Doctor of Philosophy (PhD) degree.

Smith began his career as an application scientist and worked for Bruker Analytische Messtechnik (part of the Bruker Corporation) in Germany. He then worked as a research scientist in the Division of Materials Science at Commonwealth Scientific and Industrial Research Organisation (CSIRO) in Australia.

== Academic career ==
Smith's research specialises in nuclear magnetic resonance (NMR) and materials physics.

In 1992, Smith returned to England and began his academic career, having been appointed a lecturer at the University of Kent. He was later promoted to reader in solid-state nuclear magnetic resonance.

In 1998, Smith moved to the University of Warwick where he had been appointed a reader in its Department of Physics. He was later promoted to Professor of Physics. He was appointed Chair of the Faculty of Science in 2005 and Pro-Vice-Chancellor for Research in 2007. On 1 May 2010, he was appointed Deputy Vice-Chancellor (DVC), making him the second most senior academic at the University of Warwick. As DVC, he deputised for the Vice-Chancellor of the university when needed, and was in charge of all academic resourcing issues (with a budget of £240 million), of human resources and of the university's capital program.

=== Lancaster University ===
On 5 August 2011, Smith was announced as the next Vice-Chancellor of Lancaster University. He took up the post on 1 January 2012, becoming the university's sixth Vice Chancellor since it was established. He was also appointed Professor of Solid State NMR in the Department of Chemistry. He was paid £271,000 in 2012/13 academic year and £281,000 in 2013/14 academic year.

=== University of Southampton ===
In April 2019, it was announced that Smith would be moving to the University of Southampton as its next President and Vice-Chancellor. He took up the appointments on 1 October 2019. He stepped down in May 2026 to take a position as Pro Vice-Chancellor at the University of Oxford.

=== External appointments ===
Outside of his university work, Smith has held a number of appointments. In 2012 and 2013, he chaired a review into the content of A-Levels. From 1 January 2013 to 31 December 2015, he was a member of the Higher Education Funding Council for Wales. In December 2014, he became a trustee of Jisc (previously called the Joint Information Systems Committee). As of March 2015, he is the chair of the Board of the Higher Education Careers Service Unit. He is also currently Chair of Advance HE's Board of Directors.

== Honours ==
Smith is an elected Fellow of the Institute of Physics (FInstP). He was appointed Commander of the Order of the British Empire (CBE) in the 2019 Birthday Honours for services to research and higher education.

Academic offices
Preceded by Paul Wellings	Vice-Chancellor of Lancaster University; 1 January 2012 - 30 September 2019	Succeeded by Andy Schofield
