= George Murray Burnett =

Scottish mathematician and chemist

George Murray Burnett FRSE

Principal of Heriot-Watt University
- In office 1974–1980
- Preceded by: Robert Allan Smith
- Succeeded by: Thomas L. Johnston

George Murray Burnett FRSE FRSA FRIC LLD (1921–1980) was a Scottish mathematician and chemist. He served as both Principal and Vice-Chancellor of Heriot-Watt University from 1974 until 1980. He is largely remembered for his work on polymer reactions.

== Life ==
He was born in Messina in South Africa on 12 July 1921.

His family moved to London in his childhood and he was educated at Mile-End School before again relocating to Aberdeen in Scotland. Here he attended Robert Gordon's College before being accepted by Aberdeen University studying chemistry and mathematics. He graduated in 1943. On graduation he immediately moved to a teaching role within the university. In 1943/4 being an Assistant Lecturer in Natural Philosophy and 1944/5 a lecturer in chemistry. In 1945 he moved to Birmingham University serving as a lecturer in chemistry there for ten years. In 1955 he received a chair in Aberdeen University and was a professor there until 1974. He then received a post as Principal of Heriot-Watt University. He served as this until his death aged only 59.

Over and above his role as Principal he served as Vice Chancellor under Chancellor Lord Thomson of Monifieth. On his death he was replaced by Prof Thomas Diery Patten.

In 1956 he was elected a Fellow of the Royal Society of Edinburgh.

He held three separate doctorates. Aberdeen University awarded him a PhD in 1947. Birmingham University awarded him a DSc in 1954. Strathclyde University awarded him an honorary Doctor of Letters (LLD) in 1979.

Burnett married Nan Bow in 1946. He died in Edinburgh on 4 September 1980.

== Publications ==
- ’'Mechanism of Polymer Reactions'’ (1954)
- ’'Energy v. 2'’ (1969)
- ’'Transfer and Storage of Energy by Molecules'’ (1969)

== Recognition ==
Burnett was painted by Peter Collins in 1982. The painting is held by Heriot-Watt University.

A building on the Heriot-Watt campus is named George Burnett Hall in his honour.
