= Andy Schofield =

British physicist

Andy Schofield FInstP
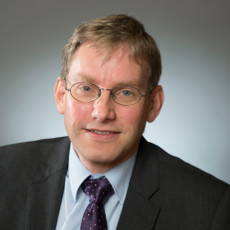
- Schofield in 2015

Principal and Vice-Chancellor of the University of Glasgow
- Incumbent
- Assumed office 1 October 2025
- Preceded by: Anton Muscatelli

Vice Chancellor of Lancaster University
- In office 1 May 2020 – 31 August 2025
- Preceded by: Mark Smith
- Succeeded by: Rebecca Lingwood (interim); Steve Decent

Personal details
- Born: c. 1970 (age c. 55)
- Education: University of Cambridge (PhD)
- Awards: Maxwell Medal and Prize
- Scientific career
- Fields: Theoretical physics
- Workplaces: University of Glasgow; University of Lancaster; University of Birmingham; University of Cambridge; Rutgers University
- Doctoral advisor: Joseph Wheatley

Andrew John Schofield (better known as Andy Schofield; born c. 1970) is an academic who is Principal and Vice Chancellor at the University of Glasgow having assumed the role on 1 October 2025. Prior to joining the University of Glasgow, Professor Schofield served as Vice-Chancellor of Lancaster University from May 2020. His earlier career includes senior leadership roles at the University of Birmingham, where he was Pro-Vice-Chancellor and Head of the College of Engineering and Physical Sciences. As a theoretical physicist, his research focus is in the theory of correlated quantum systems, in particular non-Fermi liquids, quantum criticality and high-temperature superconductivity.

== Biography ==
Andy Schofield was educated at Whitgift School before reading Natural Sciences at Gonville and Caius College, Cambridge. In 1993, he obtained his PhD at the Cavendish Laboratory in Cambridge and won a College Research Fellowship at Gonville and Caius. He was a postdoctoral researcher at Rutgers University before his return to Cambridge as a Royal Society University Research Fellow. He joined the School of Physics and Astronomy at the University of Birmingham in 1999, became the head of school in 2010, and was promoted in 2015 to pro-vice-chancellor and head of the College of EPS. Schofield served as Vice-Chancellor of Lancaster University from May 2020.

Schofield is currently the Principal and Vice-Chancellor of the University of Glasgow, having assumed the role on 1 October 2025. He succeeded Anton Muscatelli, becoming the university’s 51st Principal.

== Awards ==
- The Schuldham Plate (1989), Gonville and Caius.
- Maxwell Medal and Prize (2002) for work on the emergent properties of correlated electrons.
- Fellow of the Institute of Physics (2002).

Academic offices
Preceded by Anton Muscatelli	Vice-Chancellor and Principal of the University of Glasgow; 1 October 2025 – present	Succeeded by Incumbent
