= Qammer H. Abbasi =

Pakistani-British engineer

Qammer Hussain Abbasi
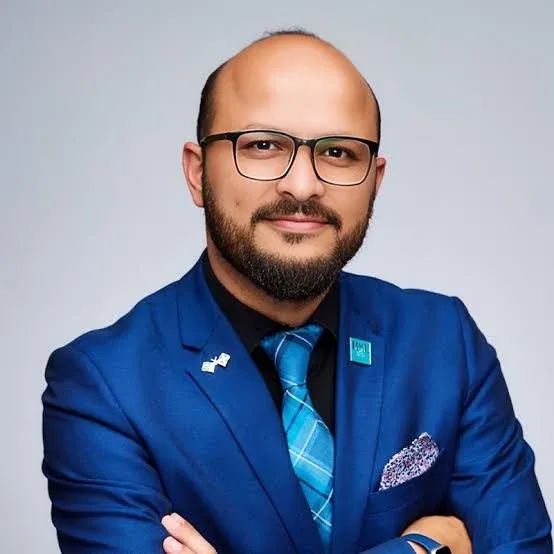
- Professor Qammer H. Abbasi, University of Glasgow
- Born: Pakistan
- Education: Queen Mary University of London (PhD); University of Engineering and Technology, Lahore (BE)
- Awards: Fellow of the Royal Society of Edinburgh (FRSE); Fellow of the Institution of Engineering and Technology (FIET)
- Scientific career
- Fields: Electromagnetics, Wireless communications, Biomedical engineering
- Workplaces: University of Glasgow
- Thesis: (2012)

Qammer Hussain Abbasi is a Pakistani–British engineer and academic who serves as Professor of Applied Electromagnetic Sensing at the University of Glasgow. His research covers electromagnetic sensing, 5G and 6G wireless systems, body-centric communication, and biomedical engineering applications.

== Early life and education ==
Abbasi was born in Pakistan and earned his undergraduate degree in electrical engineering from the University of Engineering and Technology, Lahore and received his PhD in 2012 from Queen Mary University of London.

== Career ==
Abbasi held academic positions internationally before joining the University of Glasgow, where he is currently Professor of Electromagnetic Sensing in the James Watt School of Engineering. He is the Director of the Centre for Integrated Sensing and Communication for Cognitive Cities (ISAC³) at the University of Glasgow and the Director of the Communication, Sensing and Imaging (CSI) Research Group. He is additionally the Co-Director of the EPSRC Centre for Doctoral Training in Future Sensing and Connectivity and is affiliated with the University's Advanced Research Centre (ARC).

Abbasi was appointed an IEEE Distinguished Lecturer for the Antennas and Propagation Society (2024–2026).

== Research ==
Abbasi's work focuses on, integrated sensing and communication, future telecom, 6G, electromagnetic sensing, bioelectromagnetics, and wireless healthcare systems. His research on contactless lip-reading using radio frequency (RF) signals has attracted media coverage for its potential applications in hearing aid technology and wireless communication systems.

== Awards and honours ==
- Fellow of the Royal Society of Edinburgh (FRSE)
- Fellow of the Institution of Engineering and Technology (FIET)
- Royal Academy of Engineering Industrial Fellowship (2024)
- URSI Young Scientist Award (2019)
- Sensors Young Scientist Award (2021)
- Member of the Scottish Science Advisory Council (2025)
- Policy Advisor, Department for Science, Innovation and Technology, UK Government
- Strategic Advisor, Scottish Government, Scottish Technology Council
