= Lombardi's Alpha Corporation =

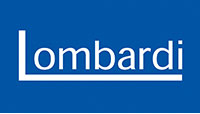
- Type: Holding company
- Industry: Publishing, Digital Media, Customer Contact Services, Consumer Goods, Direct Marketing and Product Fulfillment
- Founded: 1986
- Founder: Michael Lombardi
- Headquarters: Ontario, Canada
- Website: https://lombardisalpha.com/

Lombardi's Alpha Corporation is a holding company that owns a group of businesses concentrated in publishing, digital media, customer contact services, consumer goods, direct marketing and product fulfillment.

== History ==
Lombardi's Alpha Corporation (formerly Lombardi Media Corporation), founded in 1986 by Canadian entrepreneur Michael Lombardi, MBA, became a public company in 1993 via a reverse-takeover of Golden Point Exploration Inc. In 2007, Michael Lombardi, who was then the major shareholder of Lombardi's Alpha Corporation with approximately 89% of the outstanding stock, purchased the remaining shares in a going-private transaction.

A subsidiary of Lombardi's Alpha Corporation, Lombardi Publishing Corporation, experienced rapid growth in the 2000s and was ranked several times as one of Canada's 100 fastest growing companies by Profit Magazine. Today, Lombardi Publishing Corporation publishes financial e-letters, periodicals, newsletters, books and reports.

In the late 1990s, Lombardi's Alpha Corporation started acquiring companies that supplied the Canadian direct marketing industry. Lombardi's Alpha Corporation purchased Avon Sale Tech Inc. and Templeman Direct Marketing Limited, two major suppliers to the Canadian direct marketing industry. The companies where merged into Clixx Direct Marketing Services Inc. which were eventually sold in 2010 to NYSE listed Cenveo Inc. In 2007, Lombardi's Alpha Corporation made its first acquisition in the U.S. direct marketing industry.
