= Critical précis =

Written work summarising the main ideas and arguments of a longer text

A critical précis, or sometimes rhetorical précis, is a short work written in an expository style similar to an essay. It summarises all the main ideas, arguments, and abstractions from longer text. The purpose of a critical précis is to make the original author's thesis more accessible by allowing readers to skip non-essential components of the original work. The writers of précis avoid copying directly from the original text—excepting cited quotations—to avoid academic plagiarism.

Précis creation is commonly assigned in humanities and liberal arts classes. Typical lengths are less than 500 to 1500 words.

== Structure ==
Introduction

Cites the main text of work being analyzed, similar to a typical essay lead paragraph

Body

Explanation of key ideas, concepts and phrases, demonstrating the implied significance and purpose of the text using direct examples of how the author supports the thesis, often relating or contrasting to the reader's assumptions (this is not a creative interpretation)

Conclusion

Summarizes the main idea and importance of the original author's thesis, and the author's connections to the intended audience

The précis is written from an impartial third-person point of view, although personal analysis of a text can also be considered précis format. The analysis of ideas is usually in chronological order.

=== Example keywords ===
The opening paragraph follows a certain structure: ...the author...

asserts, argues, believes, claims, conveys the thought, declares, demonstrates, elucidates, expounds the idea, finds, identifies the fact, illustrates, implies, points out, posits, proposes, reports, reveals, states, suggests...that...

followed by a clause explaining the thesis. This clause is typically similar in scope to the concluding sentence of the final paragraph.

These words exemplify the use of rhetorically accurate verbs.

== See also ==
- Abstract (summary)
- Axiom
- Critical thinking
- Microblogging
- Rhetorical criticism
- Syllogism
