= Chaminade College School =

Catholic school in Toronto, Ontario, Canada

Location
- 490 Queen's Drive; Maple Leaf, North York, Ontario, M6L 1M8; Canada; 43.71°N 79.496°W

Information
- Type: Separate
- Motto: Fortes in Fide (Strong in Faith)
- Religious affiliation: Roman Catholic
- Founded: 1964
- School board: Toronto Catholic District School Board
- Superintendent: Robert D'Addario; Area 2
- Area trustee: Daniel Di Giorgio; Ward 10
- School number: 509 / 695947
- Principal: Francesco Malfitano
- Grades: 9-12
- Gender: Boys
- Enrolment: 908 (2017-18)
- Language: English
- Colours: Green and Gold
- Team name: Chaminade Gryphons
- Affiliation: Roman Catholic (Congregation of Christian Brothers and Society of Mary)
- Parish: St. Bernard
- Specialist High Skills Major: Business; Environment; Information and Communications Technology; Sports
- Website: chaminadecollege.tcdsb.org

Chaminade College School (CCS, Chaminade) is an all-boys Catholic secondary school in Toronto, Ontario, Canada.

== History ==
Founded by the Archdiocese of Toronto, Chaminade College School opened its doors in September 1965. Initially under the control of the Society of Mary (the Marianists), the school was named for the Society's founder, Father William Joseph Chaminade.

The mandate of the school was to prepare young men for post-secondary education in a traditional Catholic secondary school environment. The school's motto "Fortes in fide" emphasizes the importance of the virtue of faith in the life of the Catholic school.

In 1967, Chaminade began a partnership with the Metropolitan Separate School Board (now Toronto Catholic District School Board). In this partnership, the Board conducted the first two years of secondary school, and the Archdiocese conducted the remaining three years. In September 1972, the Irish Christian Brothers took over administration of the school, until their departure in June 1988. The school is currently administered entirely by the TCDSB after funding was expanded while the religious identity of the school was preserved.

The school won a Green Toronto award in 2007 for its pioneering efforts in establishing the Adopt a Stream project that became a citywide model for waterway cleanup. In 2008, students circulated a petition which resulted in the Province of Ontario outlawing smoking in automobiles when children are passengers. In 2025 Chaminade also won the Sr Toronto Bowl.

Chaminade is also known for its athletic achievements with former Gryphons Tevaun Smith and James Bodanis moving on to play football in the NCAA and the CFL.

Nadia Pasquini, a veteran teacher at Chaminade, received the Prime Minister's Award for Teaching Excellence for the 2016–2017 school year. Pasquini's feats include fundraising over $24,000 for the Free the Children organization as well as partnering with the Working Against Violence Everyday group to raise awareness about screen addiction.

== Overview ==
=== Concert Band ===
The Chaminade Concert Band is led by the lone music teacher at Chaminade College School, Joseph Lesley, years prior was Zachary Laidlaw. In 2008 Alex Voros (the music teacher prior to Zachary Laidlaw and Lesley.) was named Canada's MusiCounts Teacher of the Year by the music education charity of the Canadian Academy of Recording Arts and Sciences.

=== Hockey Program ===
Chaminade College School has a hockey program that has helped produce and shape many NHL, OHL, NCAA, CIS and OJHL level players over the years.

NHL: Jason Woolley, Mark Giordano, Gino Cavallini, Paul Cavallini, Michael Vernace and Akim Aliu. AHL: Zayde Wisdom ECHL: Phil Gianfrancesco, Hudson Wilson, Daniel Vernace NCAA: Giacomo Martino, Zach Wisdom, Armando Scarlato

TCDAA/MSSB Championship Banners: Junior - [1994, 2000] Senior - [1993] Varsity A - [*] Varsity B - [2020]

== Notable alumni ==
- Tevaun Smith
- Lukas Rossi
- Olu Famutimi
- Jason Woolley
- Mark Giordano
- Gino Cavallini
- Paul Cavallini
- Miguel Cañizalez
- Michael Vernace
- Martin Broda
- Merwin Mondesir
- Michael Lombardi

== See also ==
- Education in Ontario
- List of secondary schools in Ontario
