= Steve Chapman (chemist) =

Australian teacher and chemist

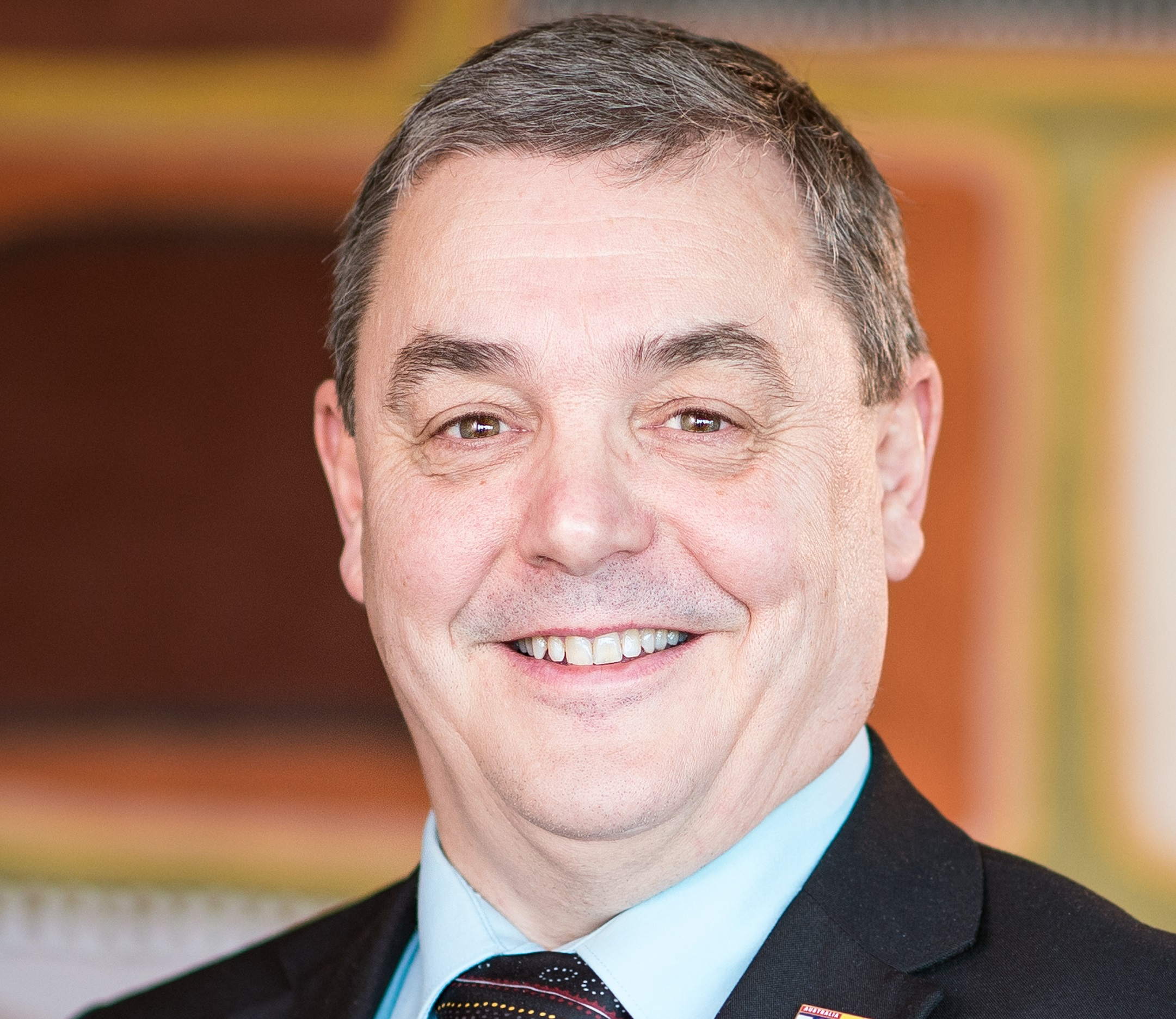

Vice-Chancellor of Edith Cowan University
- In office 1 April 2015 – 31 July 2024

Principal of Heriot-Watt University
- In office 2009–2015
- Preceded by: Anton Muscatelli
- Succeeded by: Richard Williams (academic)

Personal details
- Born: Steven Kenneth Chapman; 12 May 1959 (age 67)
- Spouse: Professor Karen Chapman
- Children: 3
- Education: Newcastle University
- Profession: Chemist

Steven Kenneth Chapman CBE FRSE FRSC CChem (born 1959) is a British chemist and academic. He served as Vice-Chancellor of Edith Cowan University in Perth, Western Australia, between 2015 and 2024. Before that, he was Principal and Vice-Chancellor of Heriot-Watt University in Edinburgh.

== Early life ==
Steve Chapman was born on 12 May 1959. Chapman studied at Newcastle University, where he received a First Class BSc (Hons) degree in Chemistry (1980) and completed a PhD in Chemistry (1983). Steve Chapman carried out his postdoctoral studies at the Massachusetts Institute of Technology on a NATO Research Fellowship from 1983 to 1985.

== Career ==
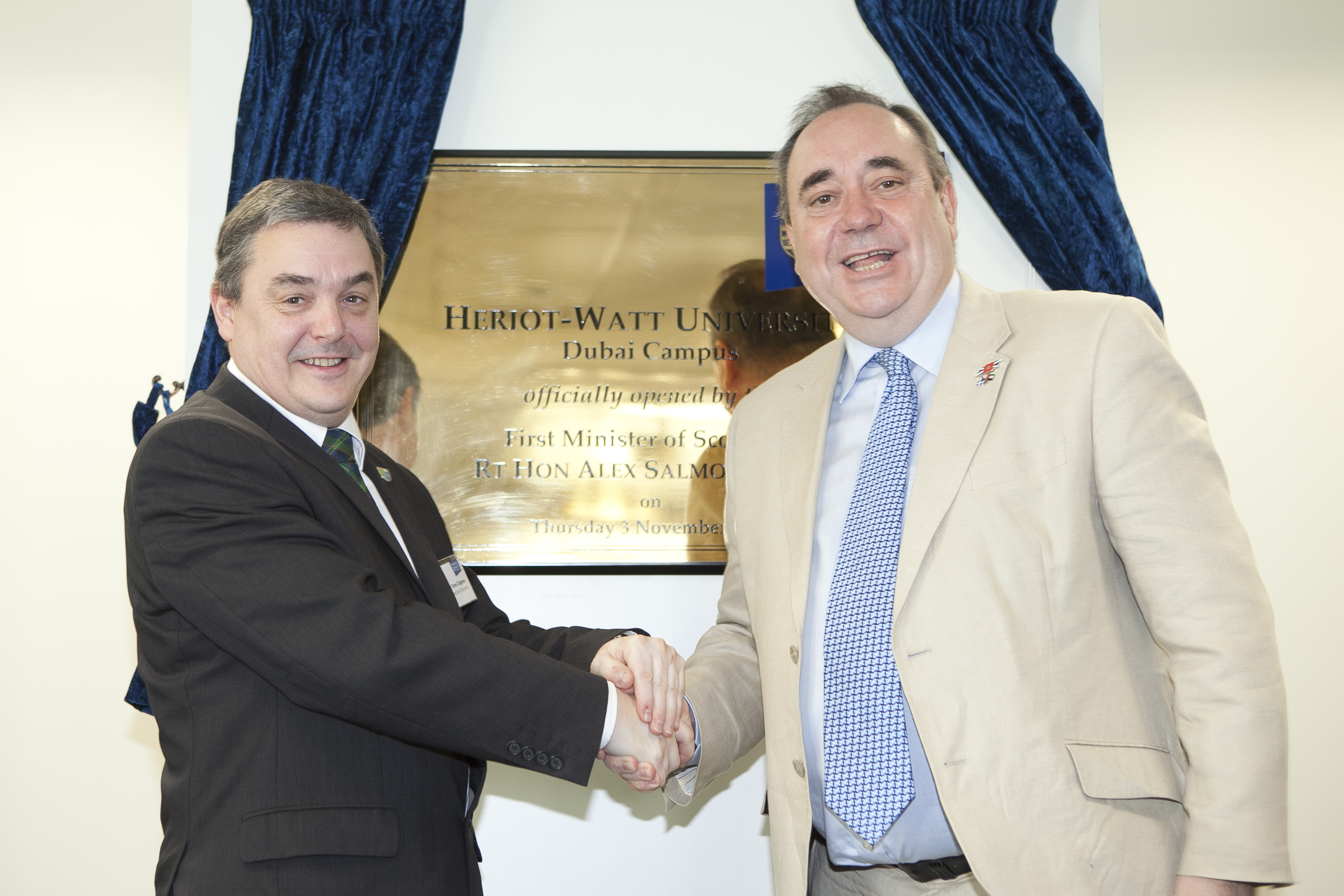
Chapman with First Minister of Scotland Alex Salmond in Dubai, 2011

Chapman returned to the UK in 1985 and was a Lecturer and then Senior Lecturer at the University of Edinburgh from 1985 to 1995, and Professor of Biological Chemistry from 1996. In 2000, he became Head of the University's School of Chemistry, and in August 2006, was appointed as Vice-Principal of Planning, Resources and Research Policy at the University. Externally, Chapman's roles have included the HEFCE TRAC(T) Steering Group, the Research and Knowledge Transfer Committee of the Scottish Funding Council, and as a representative on LERU and Universitas 21. He was a member of the Board of UCEA and was a previous member of the Board of Directors of Edinburgh Research and Innovation Limited. He has published over 200 research publications and in 2001 received the Royal Society of Chemistry Interdisciplinary Award for major contributions to science at the Chemistry/Biology interface. In 2005 Chapman became a Fellow of the Royal Society of Edinburgh and the Royal Society of Chemistry.

Chapman was appointed Commander of the Order of the British Empire (CBE) in the 2016 New Year Honours for services to higher education as Vice-Chancellor of Heriot-Watt.

In April 2015, Chapman commenced his role as Vice-Chancellor and President of Edith Cowan University in Perth, Western Australia. After 17 years as a Vice-Chancellor in the United Kingdom and Australia, he retired on 31 July 2024.

Academic offices
Preceded by Professor Anton Muscatelli	Principal of Heriot-Watt University; 1 September 2009 to 31 March 2015	Succeeded by Richard Williams
