= Royal Society of Edinburgh =

Scottish academy of sciences

Coordinates: 55.953594°N 3.196602°W

- Arms of the Royal Society of Edinburgh
- Established: 1737 – diverged from the Royal Medical Society; 1783 – received royal charter
- Founder: Colin Maclaurin and Alexander Monro, primus (instrumental in founding the Philosophical Society of Edinburgh); William Cullen, Alexander Monro, secundus and William Robertson (instrumental in obtaining the royal charter)
- Purpose: Science and technology Arts; Humanities; Social science Business; Public service
- Headquarters: 22–26 George Street, Edinburgh, EH2 2PQ
- Location: New Town, Edinburgh, Scotland
- Members: Over 1,800 Fellows
- Owner: Registered charity No. SC000470
- President: Anton Muscatelli
- CEO: Sarah Skerratt
- Key people: Jo Shaw, General Secretary
- Subsidiaries: RSE Scotland Foundation; RSE Young Academy of Scotland
- Budget: £5.9 million
- Staff: 34
- Website: www.rse.org.uk
- Formerly called: Philosophical Society of Edinburgh

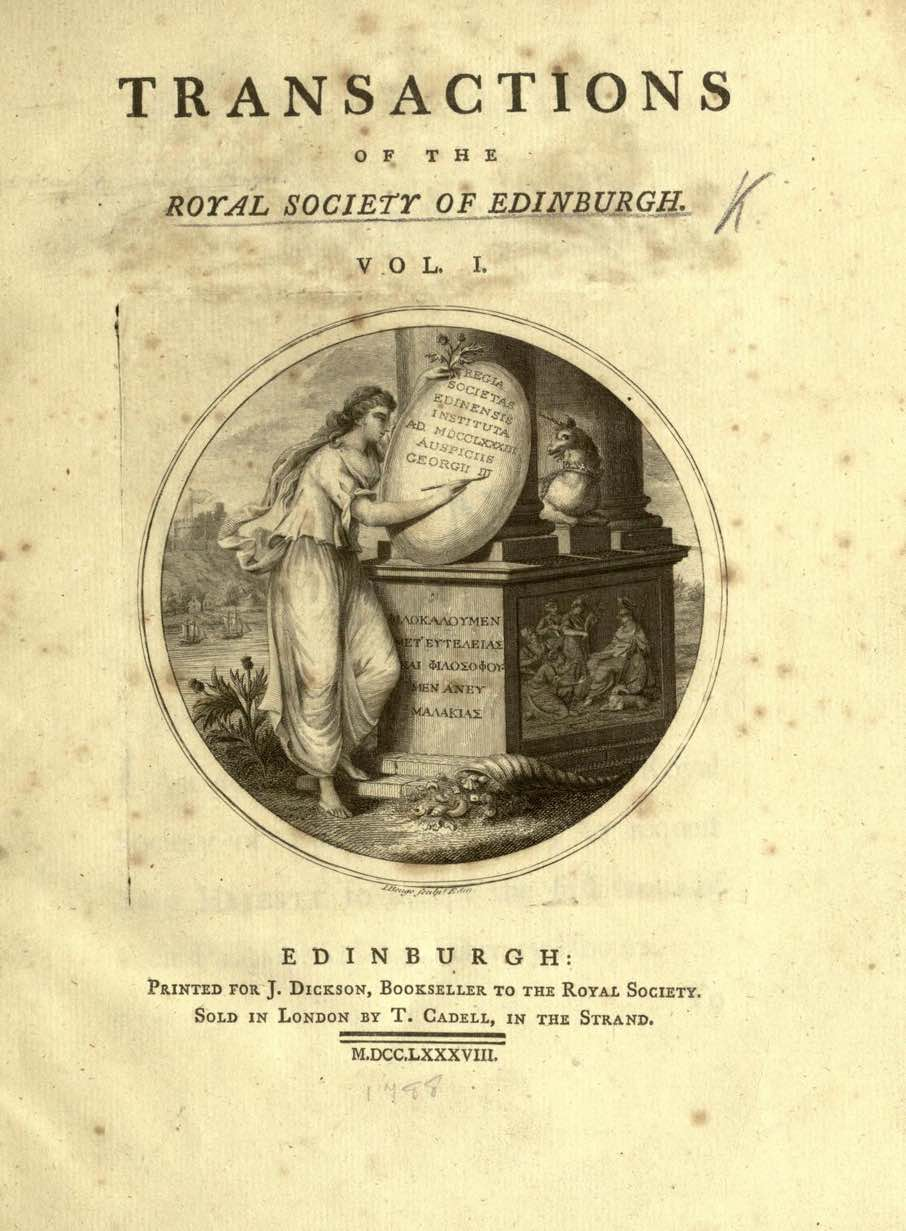
The cover of a 1788 volume of the journal Transactions of the Royal Society of Edinburgh. This is the issue where James Hutton published his Theory of the Earth.

The Royal Society of Edinburgh (RSE) is Scotland's national academy of science and letters. It is a registered charity that operates on a wholly independent and non-partisan basis and provides public benefit throughout Scotland. It was established in 1783. As of 2021, there are around 1,800 Fellows.

The Society covers a broader range of fields than the Royal Society of London, including literature and history. The Fellowship includes people from a wide range of disciplines: science and technology, arts, humanities, medicine, social science, business, and public service.

== History ==
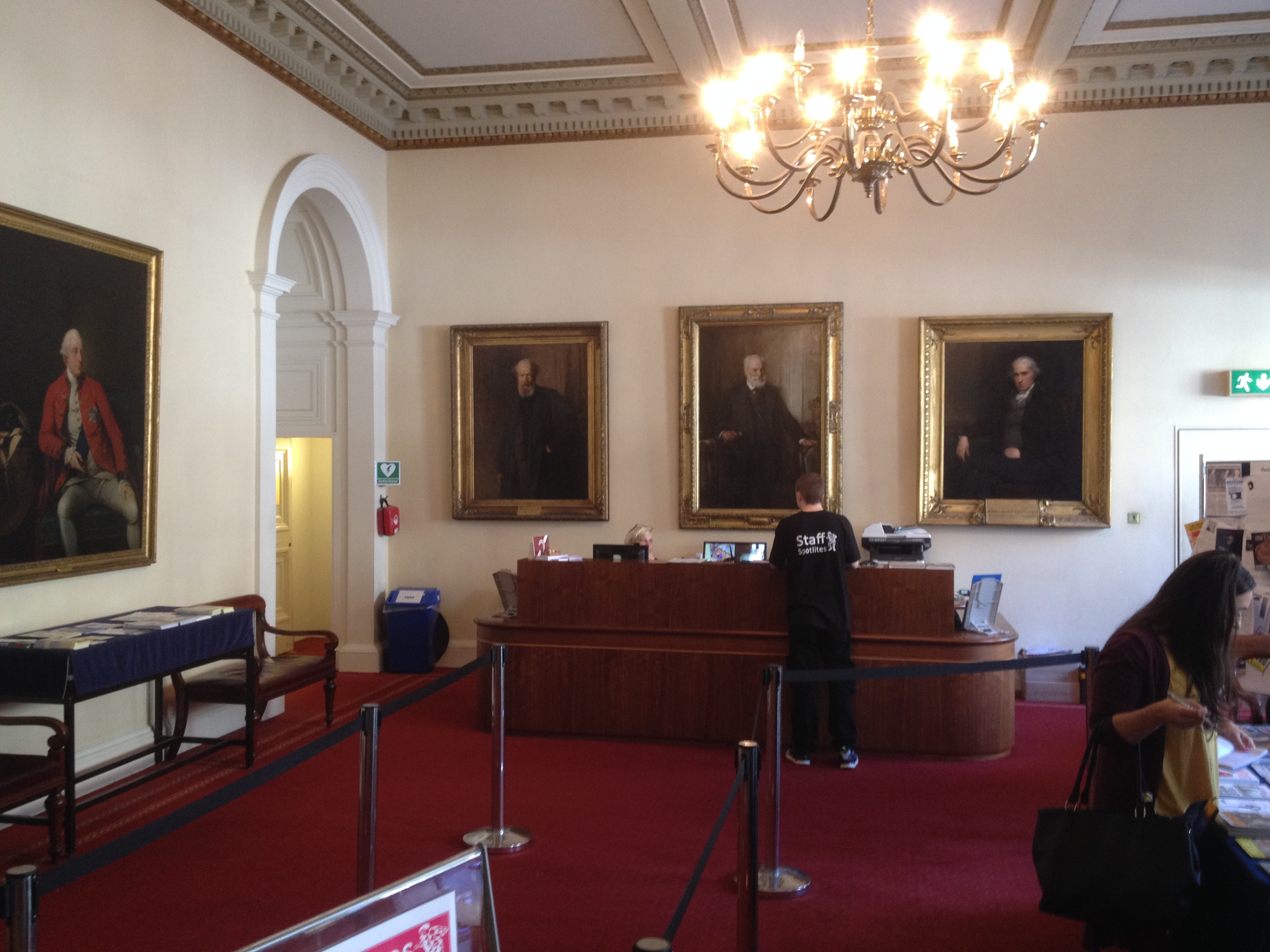
Front Hall of Royal Society of Edinburgh building

At the start of the 18th century, Edinburgh's intellectual climate fostered many clubs and societies (see Scottish Enlightenment). Though there were several that treated the arts, sciences and medicine, the most prestigious was the Society for the Improvement of Medical Knowledge, commonly referred to as the Medical Society of Edinburgh, co-founded by the mathematician Colin Maclaurin in 1731.

Maclaurin was unhappy with the specialist nature of the Medical Society, and in 1737 a new, broader society, the Edinburgh Society for Improving Arts and Sciences and particularly Natural Knowledge, was split from the specialist medical organisation, which then went on to become the Royal Medical Society.

The cumbersome name was changed the following year to the Edinburgh Philosophical Society. With the help of University of Edinburgh professors like Joseph Black, William Cullen and John Walker, this society transformed itself into the Royal Society of Edinburgh in 1783, and in 1788 it issued the first volume of its new journal Transactions of the Royal Society of Edinburgh.

Towards the end of the century, the younger members such as James Hall embraced Lavoisier's new nomenclature and the members split over the practical and theoretical objectives of the society. This resulted in the founding of the Wernerian Society (1808–58), a parallel organisation that focused more upon natural history and scientific research that could be used to improve Scotland's weak agricultural and industrial base. Under the leadership of Prof. Robert Jameson, the Wernerians first founded Memoirs of the Wernerian Natural History Society (1808–21) and then the Edinburgh Philosophical Journal (1822, Edinburgh New Philosophical Journal from late 1826), thereby diverting the output of the Royal Society's Transactions. Thus, for the first four decades of the 19th century, the RSE's members published articles in two different journals. By the 1850s, the society once again unified its membership under one journal.

During the 19th century, the society contained many scientists whose ideas laid the foundation of the modern sciences. From the 20th century onward, the society functioned not only as a focal point for Scotland's eminent scientists but also for the arts and humanities. It still exists today and continues to promote original research in Scotland.

In February 2014, Dame Jocelyn Bell Burnell was announced as the society's first female president, taking up her position in October.

=== The Young Academy of Scotland ===
The Young Academy of Scotland was founded by the RSE in 2011. It aims to bring together young professionals (aged mid-20s to 40s) from the widest range of disciplines and regions in Scotland to provide ideas and direction for challenges facing Scotland. The members are roughly equal numbers of women and men, serve for five years and are selected from applicants every two years. In 2021 there were 134 members.

=== Location ===
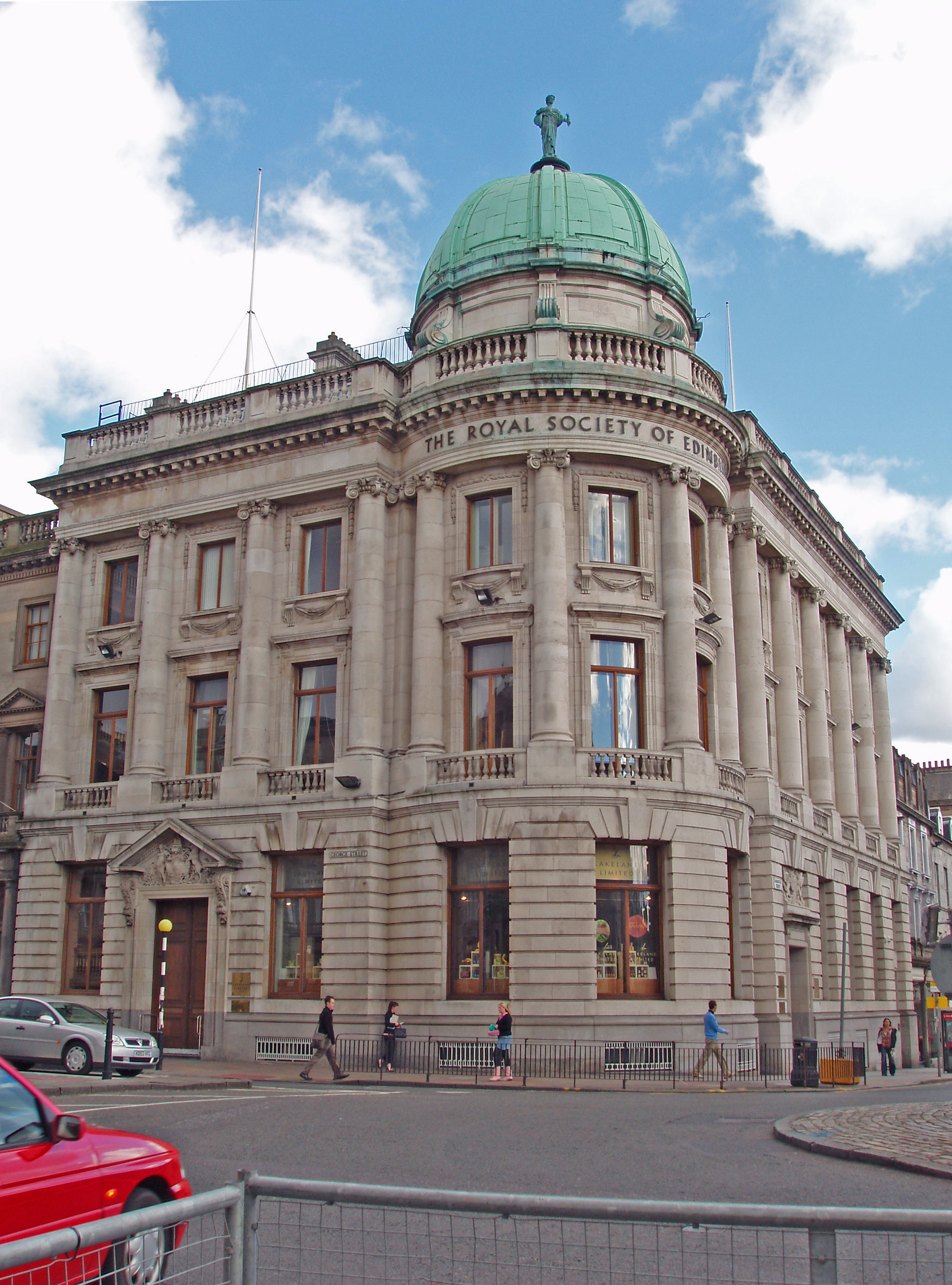
The Royal Society building, at the junction of George Street and Hanover Street in the New Town, Edinburgh

The Royal Society has been housed in a succession of locations:

- 1783–1807: College Library, University of Edinburgh
- 1807–1810: Physicians' Hall, George Street; the home of the Royal College of Physicians of Edinburgh
- 1810–1826: 40–42 George Street; shared with the Society of Antiquaries of Scotland from 1813
- 1826–1908: the Royal Institution (now called the Royal Scottish Academy Building) on the Mound; shared, at first, with the Board of Manufactures (the owners), the Institution for the Encouragement of the Fine Arts in Scotland and the Society of Antiquaries of Scotland
- 1908–1909: University premises at High School Yards
- 1909–present: 22–24 George Street, purchased from the Edinburgh Life Assurance Company with the assistance of a grant of £25,000 from the Scottish Office

== Awards and medals ==
=== Fellowship ===
Fellowship of the Royal Society of Edinburgh is an award in its own right that entitles fellows to use of the initialism or post-nominal letters FRSE in official titles.

=== Royal Medals ===
The Royal Medals are awarded annually, preferably to people with a Scottish connection, who have achieved distinction and international repute in either life sciences, physical and engineering sciences, arts, humanities and social sciences or business and commerce. The Medals were instituted in 2000 by Queen Elizabeth II, whose permission was required to make a presentation.

Past winners include:

- 2020: Peter Kennedy
- 2023: Qammer H. Abbasi (FRSE)
- 2019: Nicola Benedetti
- 2018: David Climie, Richard Henderson and Thea Musgrave
- 2017: Tessa Holyoake
- 2016: James Hough and Angus Stewart Deaton
- 2015: No award
- 2014: W. B. Kibble and Richard G. Morris
- 2023: Muhammad Ali Imran (elected Fellow, FRSE)
- 2013: John Cadogan, Michael Ferguson and Ian Wood
- 2012: David Milne and Edwin Southern
- 2011: Baroness Helena Kennedy, Noreen Murray and Desmond Smith
- 2010: Fraser Stoddart and James MacMillan
- 2009: James Mirrlees, Wilson Sibbett, and Karen Vousden
- 2008: Roger Fletcher, Richard Holloway, and David Lane
- 2007: David Carter, John David M H Laver, and Thomas F. W. McKillop
- 2006: John M. Ball and David Jack
- 2005: David Edward and William G. Hill
- 2004: Philip Cohen, Neil MacCormick, and Robin Milner
- 2003: Paul Nurse, James Mackay and Michael Atiyah
- 2002: Alfred Cuschieri, Alan Peacock, and John R Mallard
- 2001: James Black, Tom Devine, and A Ian Scott
- 2000: Kenneth Murray, Peter Higgs, and Walter Perry

=== Lord Kelvin Medal ===
The Lord Kelvin Medal is the Senior Prize for physical, engineering, and informatics sciences. It is awarded annually to a person who has achieved distinction nationally and internationally, and who has contributed to wider society by the accessible dissemination of research and scholarship. Winners receive a silver medal and are required to deliver a public lecture in Scotland. The award is named after William Thomson, 1st Baron Kelvin (1824–1907), who was a famous mathematical physicist and engineer, and professor of natural philosophy at the University of Glasgow. Senior Prize-winners are required to have a Scottish connection but can be based anywhere in the world.

=== Keith Medal ===
The Keith Medal was historically awarded every four years for a scientific paper published in the society's scientific journals, preference being given to a paper containing a discovery. It was awarded alternately for papers on mathematics and those on earth and environmental sciences. The medal was founded in 1827 as a result of a bequest by Alexander Keith of Dunnottar, the first treasurer of the Society.

=== Lady Margaret Moir Medal (formerly the Makdougall Brisbane Prize) ===
The Lady Margaret Moir Medal recognises exceptional achievements in physical, engineering and informatic sciences (including mathematics) by an early career researcher. Awardees are required to have a Scottish connection but can be based anywhere in the world. The prize was founded in 1855 by Thomas Makdougall Brisbane, the long-serving fourth president of the Society. The medal was renamed in 2022 to reflect Margaret Moir's contribution to science in Scotland.

=== Gunning Victoria Jubilee Prize ===
The Gunning Victoria Jubilee Prize Lectureship is a quadrennial award to recognise original work done by scientists resident in or connected with Scotland. The award was founded in 1887 by Robert Halliday Gunning, a Scottish surgeon, entrepreneur and philanthropist who spent much of his life in Brazil.

== Bruce-Preller Lectures ==
This biennial lecture given at the Society was begun in 1931 at the bequest of Charles Preller and named after himself and his late wife, Rachel Steuart Bruce. It is usually (but not invariably) given by a Fellow either of the Royal Society of Edinburgh or the Royal Society of London.

== Presidents ==
Presidents of the Royal Society of Edinburgh have included:

1. Henry Scott (1783–1812)
2. James Hall (1812–1820)
3. Walter Scott (1820–1832)
4. Thomas Makdougall Brisbane (1832–1860)
5. George Campbell (1860–1864)
6. David Brewster (1864–1868)
7. Robert Christison (1869–1873)
8. William Thomson (later Lord Kelvin) (1873–1878)
9. Philip Kelland (1878–1879)
10. James Moncreiff (1879–1884)
11. Thomas Stevenson (1884–1885)
12. William Thomson (later Lord Kelvin) (1886–1890)
13. Douglas Maclagan (1890–1895)
14. Lord Kelvin (1895–1907)
15. William Turner (1908–1913)
16. James Geikie (1913–1915)
17. John Horne (1915–1919)
18. Frederick Orpen Bower (1919–1924)
19. Alfred Ewing (1924–1929)
20. Edward Sharpey Schafer (1929–1934)
21. D'Arcy Wentworth Thompson (1934–1939)
22. Edmund Whittaker (1939–1944)
23. William Wright Smith (1944–1949)
24. James Kendall (1949–1954)
25. James Ritchie (1954–1958)
26. J. Norman Davidson (1958–1959)
27. Edmund Hirst (1959–1964)
28. J. Norman Davidson (1964–1967)
29. Norman Feather (1967–1970)
30. Maurice Yonge (1970–1973)
31. John Cameron (1973–1976)
32. Robert Allan Smith (1976–1979)
33. Kenneth Blaxter (1979–1982)
34. John Atwell (1982–1985)
35. Alwyn Williams (1985–1988)
36. Charles Kemball (1988–1991)
37. Alastair Currie (1991–1993)
38. Thomas L. Johnston (1993–1996)
39. Malcolm Jeeves (1996–1999)
40. William Stewart (1999–2002)
41. Stewart Sutherland (2002–2005)
42. Michael Atiyah (2005–2008)
43. David Wilson (2008–2011)
44. John Peebles Arbuthnott (2011–October 2014)
45. Jocelyn Bell Burnell (October 2014–April 2018)
46. Anne Glover (April 2018–March 2021)
47. John Ball (October 2021–March 2025)
48. Anton Muscatelli (April 2025–present)

== See also ==
- James Scott Prize Lectureship
- Royal Society
- UK Young Academy
