= Industrial process imaging =

Industrial process imaging, or industrial process tomography or process tomography are methods used to form an image of a cross-section of vessel or pipe in a chemical engineering or mineral processing, or petroleum extraction or refining plant. Process imaging is used for the development of process equipment such as filters, separators and conveyors, as well as monitoring of production plant including flow rate measurement. As well as conventional tomographic methods widely used in medicine such as X-ray computed tomography, magnetic resonance imaging and gamma ray tomography, and ultra-sound tomography, new and emerging methods such as electrical capacitance tomography and magnetic induction tomography and electrical resistivity tomography (similar to medical electrical impedance tomography) are also used.

Although such techniques are not in widespread deployment in industrial plant there is an active research community, including a Virtual Center for industrial Process Tomography, and a regular World Congress on Industrial Process Tomography, now organized by a learned society for this area, the International Society for Industrial Process Tomography

A number of applications of tomography of process equipment were described in the 1970s, using Ionising Radiation from X-ray or isotope sources but routine use was limited by the high cost involved and safety constraints. Radiation-based methods used long exposure times which meant that dynamic measurements of the real-time behaviour of process systems were not feasible. The use of electrical methods to image industrial processes was pioneered by Maurice Beck at the UMIST in the mid-1980s

== See also ==
- Industrial Tomography Systems
- Process tomography
- Imaging
