= Process tomography =

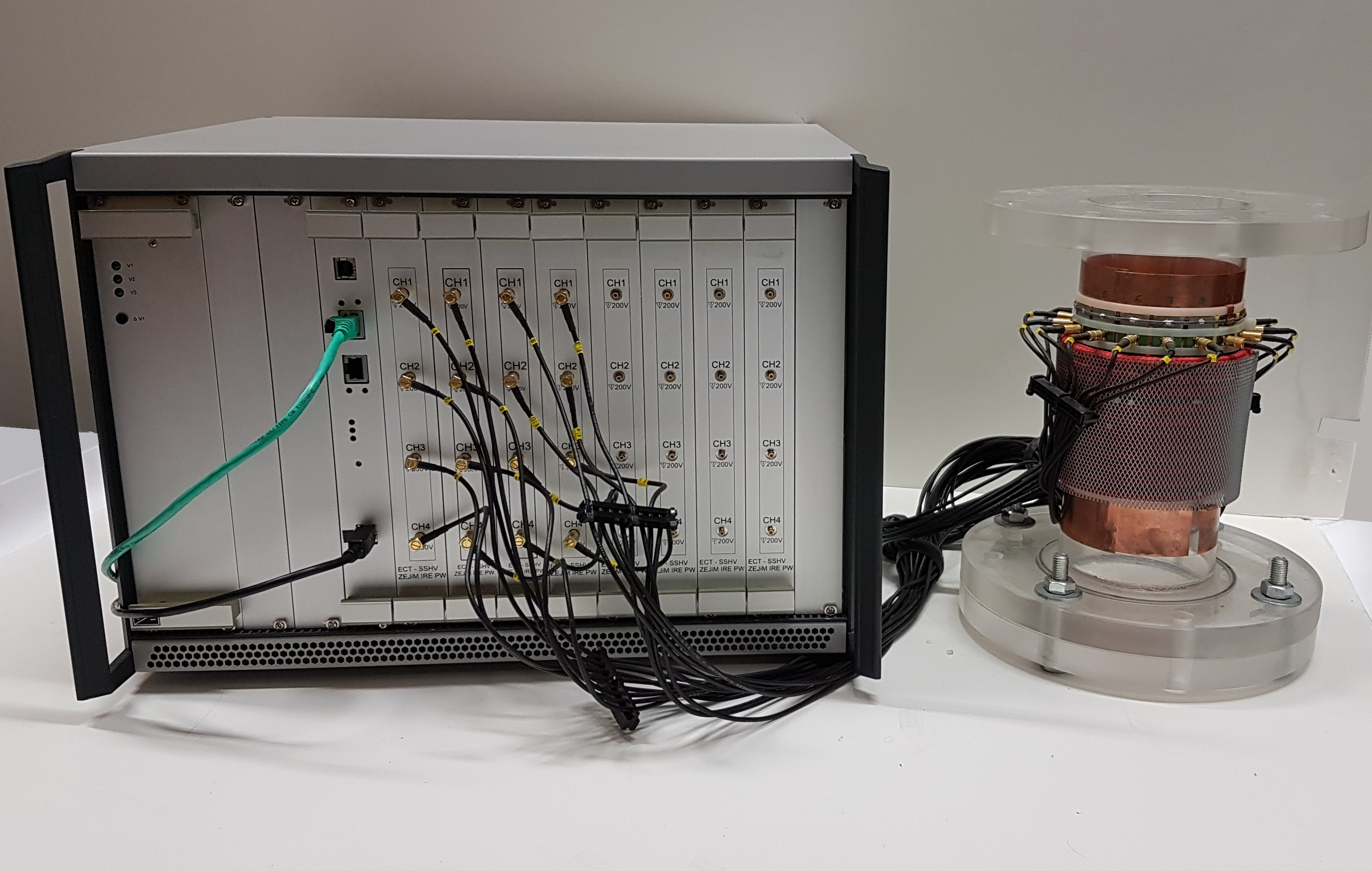
Electrical capacitance tomography system with connected 16-electrode sensor

Dynamic imaging in process tomography - On the left, seven objects moving along the probe. On the right, a series of probe cross-sectional images

Process tomography consists of tomographic imaging of systems, such as process pipes in industry. In tomography the 3D distribution of some physical quantity in the object is determined. There is a widespread need to get tomographic information about process. This information can be used, for example, in the design and control of processes.

Tomography involves taking measurements around the periphery of an object (e.g. process vessel or patient) to determine what is going on inside.

The best known technique is CT scanning in medicine; however, process tomography instrumentation needs to be cheaper, faster and more robust.

Many different imaging methods are used in process tomography, e.g. ultrasonic imaging, positron emission tomography (PET), electrical resistance tomography (ERT) and electrical impedance tomography (EIT), electrical capacitance tomography (ECT), magnetic induction tomography (MIT). In all cases external sensors are used to detect signals from boundary of the object, and the three-dimensional material distribution or the velocity field is computed using the measured data. Williams, R. A.; Beck, M. S. (1995). Process Tomography: Principles, Techniques, and Applications. Butterworth-Heinemann. ISBN 0750607440. Process tomography is an area of rapid growth both in terms of research and applications. There are number of challenges remaining in this area including data processing an image reconstruction, and application of imaging modalities in a real applications.

== See also ==
- Electrical impedance tomography
- Electrical resistivity tomography
- Electrical capacitance tomography
- Three-dimensional electrical capacitance tomography
- Industrial Tomography Systems
