= EIDORS =

Image reconstruction software toolbox

- Release: 1999; 27 years ago
- Stable release: 3.10 / December 2019; 6 years ago
- Written in: MATLAB/GNU Octave, Objective C and C++
- Operating system: Windows, Linux, SunOS/Solaris
- License: GNU GPL 2 or 3
- Website: eidors.org

EIDORS is an open-source software tool box written mainly in MATLAB/GNU Octave designed primarily for image reconstruction from electrical impedance tomography (EIT) data, in a biomedical, industrial or geophysical setting. The name was originally an acronym for Electrical Impedance Tomography and Diffuse Optical Reconstruction Software. While the name reflects the original intention to cover image reconstruction of data from the mathematically similar near infra red diffuse optical imaging, to date there has been little development in that area.

The project was launched in 1999 with a Matlab code for 2D EIT reconstruction which had its origin in the PhD thesis of Marko Vauhkonen and the work of his supervisor Jari Kaipio at the University of Kuopio. While Kuopio also developed a three dimensional EIT code this was not released as open-source. Instead the three dimensional version of EIDORS was developed from work done at UMIST (now University of Manchester) by Nick Polydorides and William Lionheart.

== Methods and models ==
The forward models in EIDORS use the finite element method and this requires mesh generation for sometimes irregular objects (such as human bodies), and the meshing needs to reflect the electrodes used to drive and measure current in EIT. For this purpose an interface was developed to the Netgen Mesh Generator.

== History ==
As the project grew there was a desire to incorporate forward modelling and reconstruction code from a variety of groups and Andy Adler and Lionheart developed a more extensible software system. The most recent version is 3.12, released in Dec, 2024.

The EIDORS project also includes a repository of EIT data distributed under open-source licenses.

== Applications ==
EIDORS has been extensively used in biomedical applications of EIT, including lung imaging, measuring cardiac output. It has been used for investigation of imaging electrical activity in the brain, and monitoring conductivity changes during radio-frequency ablation. Outside medical imaging the toolbox has been used in process tomography, geophysics and materials science.
