= Andrzej Bronisław Pląskowski =

Polish scientist (1927–2026)

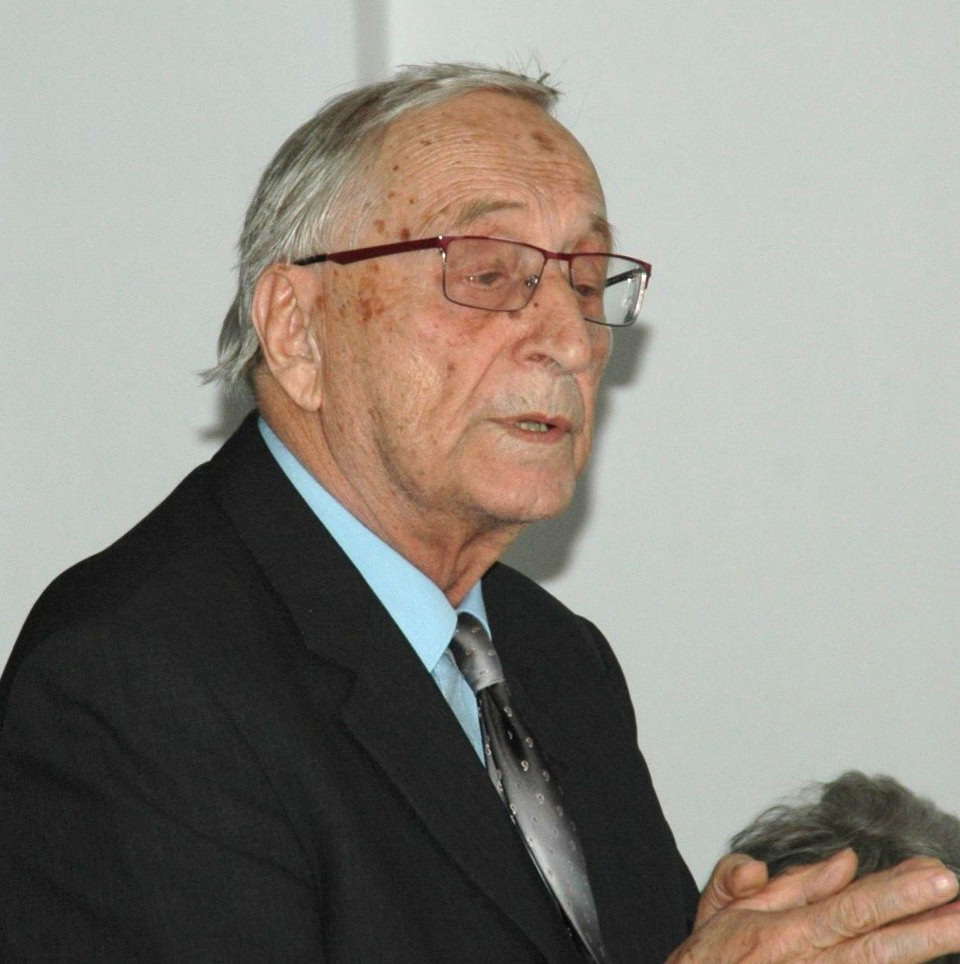
- Andrzej Pląskowski at a seminar in 2017
- Born: February 18, 1927; Warsaw
- Died: April 13, 2026 (aged 99)
- Education: University of Manchester (DSc); Warsaw University of Technology (PhD)
- Alma mater: Warsaw University of Technology
- Known for: Process tomography
- Scientific career
- Workplaces: University of Manchester, Warsaw University of Technology

Andrzej Bronisław Pląskowski (born 18 February 1927 in Warsaw, died 13 April 2026) was a Polish scientist, one of the pioneers of process tomography, and a co-author of the first article on electrical capacitance tomography.

== Biography ==
He took part in the Warsaw Uprising in the "Krawiec" company under the nom de guerre "Andrzej II". After the fall of the uprising, he was taken prisoner by the Germans and held in the Stalag X-B camp.

In the 1980s, at the University of Manchester, he worked with Professor Maurice Beck's team on the application of tomographic techniques in process engineering. He was the author of numerous patents, scientific papers, and books. His publications are frequently cited in scientific literature (over 1,700 citations).

He initiated the organization of the International Symposia on Process Tomography in Poland (Jurata 2000, Wrocław 2002, Łódź 2004, Warsaw 2006, Zakopane 2008), thereby contributing to the development of research on this technique in Poland.

== Decorations ==
- 1982: Warsaw Uprising Cross
- 1948: Medal for Warsaw 1939–1945
- 1944: Cross of Valour (Poland)
- 1976: Partisan Cross
- Cross of Merit with Swords (Poland)

== See also ==
- Process tomography
- Electrical capacitance tomography
