= William Lionheart =

British applied mathematician and inverse problems researcher

William R. B. Lionheart
- Born: William Robert Breckon
- Education: University of Warwick (B.Sc.); University of California, Berkeley, Oxford Brookes University (Ph.D.)
- Known for: Electrical impedance tomography; inverse problems; tomographic reconstruction
- Scientific career
- Fields: Applied mathematics; inverse problems; tomographic imaging
- Workplaces: University of Manchester; Oxford Brookes University; UMIST
- Doctoral advisor: Michael Pidcock, David C. Barber

William Robert Breckon Lionheart is a British applied mathematician specialising in inverse problems, tomographic imaging, and low‑frequency electromagnetic sensing. He is Professor of Applied Mathematics at the University of Manchester. His research spans theoretical, numerical, and practical aspects of inverse problems with applications in medicine, industry, security, and non‑destructive testing.

== Early life and education ==
Lionheart attended Larkmead School in Abingdon-on-Thames as a child, then studied mathematics at the University of Warwick, receiving a 1st class hons B.Sc. degree. He completed his Ph.D. at Oxford Brookes University in 1990 under the supervision of Michael Pidcock working on problems in Electrical Impedance Tomography.

== Academic career ==
Lionheart began his academic career at Oxford Polytechnic (later Oxford Brookes University), where he worked as a lecturer and senior lecturer. In 1999 he joined UMIST as Lecturer in Applied Mathematics, becoming Reader in 2002. Following the merger that created the modern University of Manchester, he was appointed Professor of Applied Mathematics in 2005.

Lionheart worked extensively on Electrical Impedance Tomography, especially in a biomedical setting. His contributions include theoretical results on uniqueness of solution for boundary shape and anisotropic conductivity, numerical algorithms for reconstruction, and reconstruction software including being a founder member of the EIDORS project.

Lionheart worked on X-ray tomography reconstruction especially for airport baggage screening, developing algorithms for a widely used fast tomography system with Rapiscan Systems. He sits on the Executive Board of the Collaborative Computational Imaging (CCPi) project that develops the Core Imaging Library (CIL) A python framework for tomographic imaging .

In 2023 Lionheart led a programme at the Isaac Newton Institute in Cambridge entitled "Rich and Nonlinear Tomography - a multidisciplinary approach" . He led held an EPSRC project 'Rich Nonlinear Tomography for advanced materials' a joint project between Manchester, Oxford and Cambridge. In this context Rich Tomography means rather than creating a simple scalar field one images a vector or tensor field, or a spectrum, or orientation density function. Examples include polarimetric tomography of magnetic fields, X-ray diffraction tomography for strain imaging, and strain tomography with polarized light

Magnetic induction tomography is closely related to EIT but a system of coils is used apply low frequency magnetic fields to image the conductivity of a body. As well as his interest in MIT for medical imaging Lionheart has worked on applications in industrial process monitoring, such as flow of molten steel. Lionheart and collaborators have also worked on the theory the location and recognition of landmines using low frequency inductive methods as well as unexploded ordnance. With Prof Tony Peyton, Lionheart founded a laboratory for developing land mine detection technology funded by Bobby Charlton's charity "Find a Better Way"

== Awards, fellowships and prizes ==
Lionheart was awarded a Harkness Fellowship in 1983 which enabled him to study at the University of California, Berkeley. In 2009 he accepted the Martin Black Prize on behalf of the team that devised `GREIT', a unified approach to 2D linear EIT reconstruction of lung images. Lionheart's team won the defence and security category at the Engineer’s Technology and Innovation Awards for their work on the Rapiscan RTT baggage scanner. During 2013 and 2014 Lionheart visited Per Christain Hansen at the Technical University of Denmark, with an Otto Mønsted visiting Fellowship. In 2015 Lionheart was awarded a Royal Society Wolfson Research merit Award for Novel Methods in Tomography imaging: "Rich tomography" and fast dynamic imaging.

== Name ==
Early publications appear under the name W. R. Breckon. By the early 1990s his papers appear under the name W. R. B. Lionheart. ORCID also lists both names as author aliases.
