= Gamma ray tomography =

Gamma ray Imaging method

Gamma ray tomography (GRT) is a non-invasive imaging technique primarily used to characterize multiphase flows within industrial processes. Utilizing gamma radiation attenuation, this technique allows for visualization and detailed analysis of the internal structure and dynamics of materials flowing through pipelines or vessels.

== Background ==
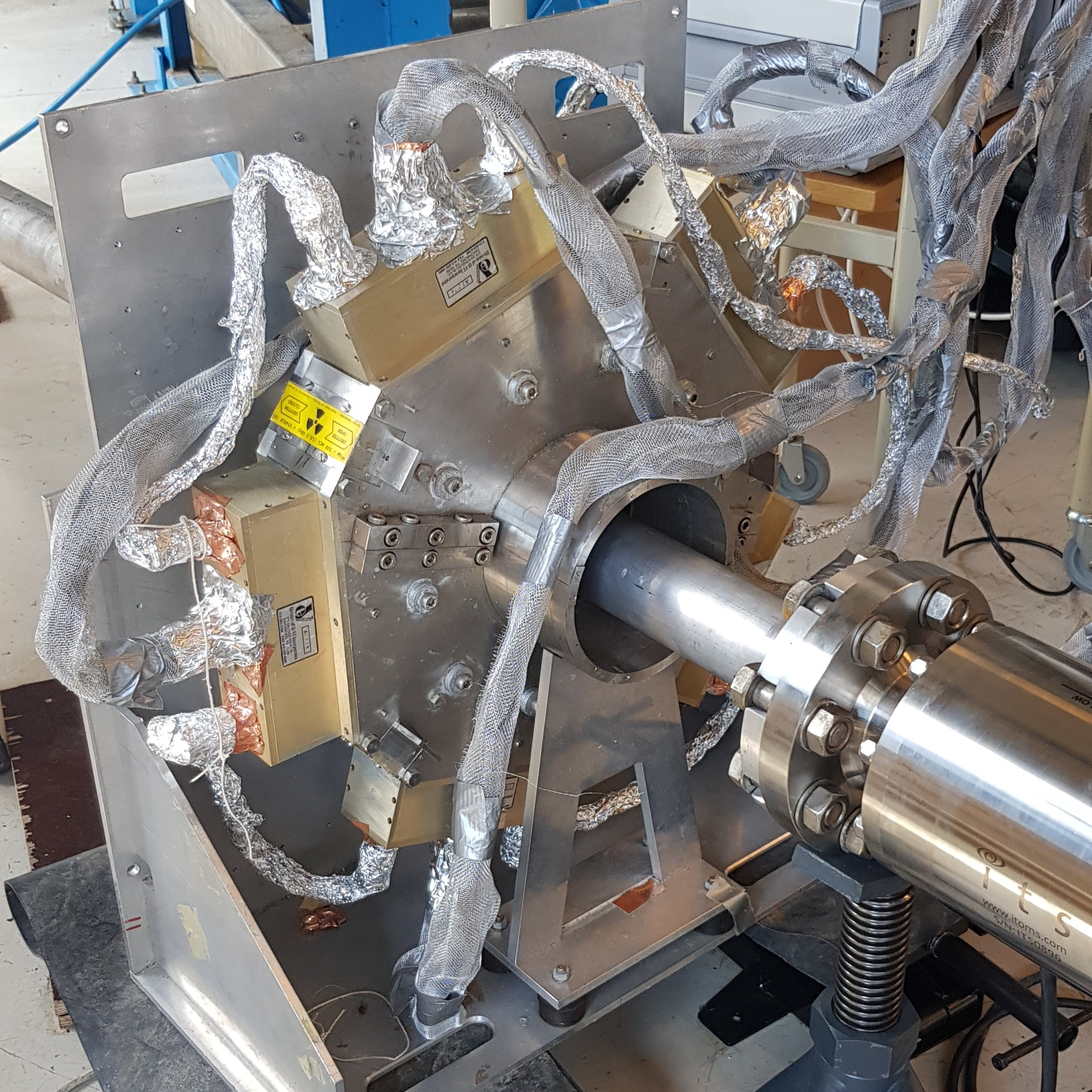
The Gamma Ray Tomograph developed at the University of Bergen in a multiphase flow test setup.

Gamma ray tomography experienced substantial advancements starting in the 1990s, notably driven by research conducted at the University of Bergen, Norway. The university pioneered high-speed gamma-ray tomography setups optimized for studying complex multiphase flows, establishing itself as a leader in industrial tomography research.

A significant development occurred with the second-generation gamma ray tomography system, collaboratively designed by the University of Bergen and Prototech for the Saskatchewan Research Council (SRC). Delivered in 2016, this advanced unit significantly enhanced real-time imaging capabilities, capturing up to 100 frames per second with improved spatial resolution. This unit has since become integral to SRC's Pipe Flow Technology Centre, facilitating advanced analysis of slurry pipeline dynamics and predictive modeling of multiphase flows.

== Operational principle ==
Gamma ray tomography operates based on gamma-ray densitometry, governed by Beer–Lambert's law:

$I=I_0Be^ {-\int{\mu(x)dx}}$

Here, $I$ is the measured intensity, $I_0$ is the source intensity, $B$ is the build-up factor, $\mu$ is the linear attenuation coefficient, and $x$ is the path length between the source and detector.

According to this principle, a narrow beam of monochromatic gamma radiation emitted from a source attenuates exponentially when passing through a material, enabling measurement of the material's density distribution along defined paths. Multiple gamma-ray sources and detectors arranged around the investigated material facilitate detailed cross-sectional image reconstruction using algorithms such as the Iterative Least Squares Technique (ILST).

The linear attenuation coefficient $\mu$ depends on material properties and photon energy. To optimize measurement accuracy, careful selection of the geometry dimensions and radioactive source with an appropriate photon energy level is crucial. The relative uncertainty in gamma densitometry measurements can be expressed as:

${\sigma_\mu \over {\mu}} = {{1\over\mu x} \sqrt{e^{\mu x}\over I_0 \tau }}$

where $\sigma_\mu$ is the absolute uncertainty of $\mu$, $x$ is the distance between the source and detector, and $\tau$ is the integration time. Since the function ${\sqrt{e^{x}}/x}$ has a minimum at $x=2$, selecting the product $\mu x$ close to this value minimizes uncertainty.

== Equipment and setup ==
Typical multiphase flow setups for gamma ray tomography require high temporal resolution. Rather than using scanning setups, these configurations consist of fixed pairs of radioactive sources and detector arrays symmetrically arranged around the pipe center. Gamma radiation emitted from radioactive sources such as Americium-241 is collimated into a fan-shaped beam covering the pipe's cross-section. Opposite these sources, detector arrays individually collimated capture narrow-beam measurements, allowing detailed cross-sectional imaging of phase distributions and densities. Semiconductor-based CdZnTe detectors are commonly utilized.

== Applications in multiphase flow research ==
Gamma ray tomography measurements of multiphase slug flow.

Though not widely implemented in daily industrial operations due to cost and complexity, gamma ray tomography remains an essential reference instrument in multiphase flow research and metering. It provides critical bench-marking data to validate and calibrate alternative multiphase measurement techniques, significantly enhancing multiphase flow research capabilities. It has also been used extensively to study different multiphase flows like slurry flow, and oil-water-gas flow in various geometries.

== Multimodal tomography ==
Combining gamma ray tomography with techniques like electrical capacitance tomography (ECT) or electrical resistance tomography (ERT) enhances multiphase characterization by utilizing complementary high spatial and temporal resolutions of these modalities.
