= Wuqiang Yang =

Chinese engineer

Wuqiang Yang (born c.1956) is a Chinese engineer who is currently Professor of Electronic Instrumentation at the University of Manchester, UK, where he specialises in electrical capacitance tomography (ECT).

Yang obtained his BEng degree in 1982 from Tsinghua University, where he also obtained his MSc in 1985 and his PhD in 1988. He joined University of Manchester Institute of Science and Technology (UMIST) in 1991 and became a full professor in 2005. He was named a Fellow of the Institute of Electrical and Electronics Engineers (IEEE) in 2012 "for contributions to electrical capacitance tomography". He established a joint research laboratory of touch sensors for domestic robots in 2019 and is the director of the joint laboratory.
