= Richard Williams (chemical engineer) =

British academic and engineer

Richard Williams CBE FREng FRSE FIChemE FIMMM CEng

Principal and Vice Chancellor of Heriot-Watt University
- In office 13 March 2015 – 30 September 2026
- Preceded by: Steve Chapman
- Succeeded by: Nola Hewitt-Dundas

Personal details
- Born: Richard Andrew Williams; 1960 (age 65–66) Worcester, England, UK
- Spouse: Jane Taylor
- Children: 2
- Education: Imperial College London (BSc, MSc, PhD)

Richard Andrew Williams is a British academic and engineer. He is a former Principal and Vice-Chancellor of Heriot-Watt University. He held this position from 1 September 2015 to 30 September 2026. He is also a chemical engineer, Vice President, and a Trustee of the Royal Academy of Engineering.

== Early life ==
He was born in Worcester in 1960 and attended The Kings School, Worcester (1967–1978). His father and grandfather were national and international motor sportsmen including Isle of Man TT race champions. He studied at Imperial College London for BSc(Eng) Hons in Mineral Technology (1983) and PhD in photoelectro chemistry applied to industrial diamond separation processes (awarded 1998).

== Career ==
Following a period in Johannesburg and Welkom, working as a trainee graduate metallurgist working in gold and uranium in processing for Anglo American Corporation (1979/80), he later joined De Beers Industrial Diamonds Research Laboratory, undertaking a PhD based in South Africa and Imperial College London (Royal School of Mines) (1982–1986). He was appointed lecturer in Chemical Engineering at University of Manchester Institute of Science and Technology (now University of Manchester) in 1986. He specialised in the area of surface and colloid engineering. In 1993 he was appointed Royal Academy of Engineering-Rio Tinto Professor of Minerals Engineering at the University of Exeter (based at the Camborne School of Mines). At the age of 33 he was one of the youngest engineering professors in the UK. He further developed a large research activity based on engineering of mineral and particulate systems.

In 1999 he was appointed as Anglo American PLC professor of mineral and process engineering at the University of Leeds where he was responsible for developing a new Institute of Particle Science and Engineering, a core development in re-development of chemical engineering at the University within the recently formed School of Process, Materials and Environmental Engineering. He was Head of the Department of Mining in 2001 until 2003. He was Director of British Nuclear Fuels Limited (BNFL) Research Alliance at University, responsible for development of new activities in nuclear energy waste processing (2000–2002). He was foundational Director of a regional Centre for Industrial Collaboration in Particle Science and Technology (2003–2006) and of the Leeds Nanomanufacturing Institute (2004–2010). He was appointed Pro-Vice-Chancellor in 2005 and was responsible for leadership of enterprise, knowledge transfer, and international strategy. He has a strong interest in design of appropriate innovation systems and effective translation of knowledge to society through commercial and not-for-profit routes in Europe and in developing communities in Middle East, Asia and Africa.

He was appointed Pro-Vice Chancellor and Head of the College of Engineering and Physical Sciences at the University of Birmingham in 2011, responsible for the operation of nine schools and a range of related business and innovation activities in the UK. He was a Director of Manufacturing Technology Centre for CATAPULT High Valve Manufacturing Centre (2011-2015) and was a council member of the West Midlands CBI (2012-2015). Williams was involved in leading the development of major collaborative projects in establishing Rolls-Royce Centre for High Temperature Research Centre (near Ansty, Coventry), the Midland Energy Accelerator, and Birmingham Centre for Cryogenic Energy Storage.

He was appointed Principal of Heriot-Watt University in Edinburgh on 13 March 2015. Professor Williams said of his appointment, "I am delighted to be joining a University that has a proud heritage and evident track record of outstanding achievement in science, engineering and business and with such a profound global reach. Heriot-Watt has an ambitious and sound strategic plan. I look forward to working with students and colleagues across the campuses in the UK, Malaysia and Dubai, along with our many partners and businesses in the ensuring the University’s future growth and success". Professor Williams took up his new post on 1 September 2015.

== Research ==
He has been associated with several major developments arising from research activities, most of these being in areas related to enhancing the environmental sustainability of engineering and manufacturing through better design or energy utilisation.

He developed applications for new methods for electrical tomographic imaging applied to the chemical and manufacturing industry that translated into patents, publications, and widespread industrial use for research, measurement, safety and control purposes. He formed Industrial Tomography Systems Ltd. in 1997, later becoming Optomo PLC and Industrial Tomography Systems. As a pioneer of the subject of industrial process tomography with Professor Maurice Beck (deceased), the area has grown into a substantial global activity, now with its own series of international conferences and international professional association, the International Society of Process Tomography. Tomographic methods have enabled optimal efficient design of industrial processes and enhanced safety and environmental practices. For example, electrical sensors have been used to replace nuclear density gauges routinely in hydraulic dredging with major environment and security benefit.

He developed and co-developed new concepts in manufacturing emulsions that were commercialised through Disperse Technologies PLC (1995–2001) that are widely used in consumer and cosmetic products. The approach offered low energy pathways to produce better formulated products. Some of these methods (membrane emulsification and cross-flow membrane emulsification) have continued to be developed to enable high throughput manufacture of responsive emulsions and capsules. These continued to find application in polymer, mineral and medical sector mining and remain an active area of research.

Pioneering the use of environmental x-ray microtomography, he co-developed new computer models for describing how anisotropic particulate materials pack together that resulted in software that can be used in pharmaceutical, and other sectors, most notable being, its application to reduce the cost of decommissioning and long-term storage of radioactive nuclear, medical, and military plants. He founded Structure Vision Ltd. (2003) that has integrated the mathematical algorithms into automated three-dimensional design and management tools. Deployment of these methods can drastically reduce the cost of nuclear decommissioning.

He co-founded Dispersia Ltd. (2006) to develop application of thermal nanofluids for accelerating the rate of heat transfer in heating and cooling applications (computers, vehicles) seeking benefits in enhanced energy efficiency and improved miniaturised process design. The technological applications are being used in demonstration projects at several locations. The company was de-registered in 2013.

He developed methodology for the practise of open-innovation in medicine and healthcare technologies using trans-national (UK-US) regional partnerships between clinicians and universities in Yorkshire and New Jersey, working with numerous stakeholders (200) and suppliers. The model (White Rose Health Innovation Partnership) demonstrated the value of such interventions to create new services, technologies, and practices resulting in numerous innovations.

He worked in accelerating the development of radical innovations in energy storage systems in UK and China to demonstrate the use of cryogenic liquids for energy storage and in the use of such liquids as a dual source of both 'cold and power'. He won major funds to enable the establishment of the UK's first Cryogenic Energy Centre (Birmingham Centre for Cryogenic Energy Storage) from EPSRC under the "Great Eight Technologies" competition and in conjunction with Highview Power Storage Ltd and the Dearman Engine Company.

== Other roles ==
Royal Academy of Engineering Vice-President (2005–2008 and again in 2015-) and inaugurated the EATechnology-Royal Academy Engineering Entrepreneurs Prize. He was a visiting professor at the University of New South Wales (UNSW) (2005-2015), Southeast University Nanjing (2015-) and China Academy of Sciences (2014-). He is a trustee of the Carnegie Trust (Scotland) (2015-) and on the advisory board of the Lloyds Register Foundation (2016-).

His former directorships include: Leeds, York and North Yorkshire Chamber of Commerce; Leeds Ventures Limited; Optomo Plc (Founder); Industrial Tomography Systems plc (Founder); Structure Vision Ltd (Founder); University of Leeds IP Limited; University of Leeds Consulting Limited; White Rose Technology Limited; University of Leeds Innovations Limited; Dispersia Ltd (Founder), Medilink (Yorkshire and Humber) Limited, Alta Innovation Ltd (2011-2015), Alta China Ltd (2011-2015) and Manufacturing Technology Centre Ltd (2011-2015).

He is an editor of Minerals Engineering, Advanced Powder Technology, Chemical Engineering Reactional Design, Particle and Particle Systems Characterisation, Particuology. Previously he has served as an editor of the Chemical Engineering Journal, Nuclear Energy Science and Technology and Recent Patents on Chemical Engineering. He is a graduate of the Higher Education Academy's Top Management Programme (2007).

== Honours ==
He was awarded OBE in the Queen's New Year Honours 2009 for services to science and engineering. He was Vice-President of the Royal Academy of Engineering (2005–2008 and again 2015-). He is Fellow of the Royal Academy of Engineering (FREng) (2000), the Australian Academy of Science, Technology and Engineering (FTSE) (2008), and the Royal Society of Edinburgh (FRSE) (2017).

Other professional fellowships include that of Institution of Chemical Engineers (FIChemE) and Institute of Materials, Minerals and Mining (FIMMM)

== Awards ==
He was named as one of the UK's top 20 science innovators as a "RISE Fellow" in 2015 by the Engineering and Physical Sciences Research Council. He is a recipient of numerous awards and prizes including the Beilby Medal and Prize in 1997, Isambard Kingdom Brunel Lectureship (1998), Noel E. Webster Mmedal (2001), Royal Academy of Engineering Silver Medal (2003) and The Society of Chemical Industry Research and Development for Society Award (2009).

== Personal life ==
He is married to the musician Jane M Taylor (married 1989) and they have two children (born 1995 and 1997). He has interests in industrial history and art, especially collecting contemporary West Penwith artists from this region back to 1900. He has personal interest in mentoring young entrepreneurs and role of philanthropic investments in research, business and social enterprise. He is a member of the Athenæum Club.

== Selected publications ==
- Process Tomography – Principles, Techniques and Applications, R.A. Williams and M.S. Beck (Eds.), Butterworth-Heinemann (Oxford), 1995, pp. 550, ISBN 0-7506-0743-2.
- Particle Aggregation and Deposition Processes: Measurement, Modelling and Simulation R.A. Williams, J. Gregory, M. Elimelech and X Jia, Butterworth-Heinemann (Oxford) 1995, pp. 441, ISBN 0-7506-0743-2.
- Colloid and Surface Engineering: Applications in the Process Industries R.A. Williams (Ed.), Butterworth-Heinemann, Oxford, 1992, pp. 345, ISBN 0-7506-0377-1 (2nd edn. published in paperback February 1994, ISBN 0-7506-1940-6).
- Electrical Impedance Tomography, M. Wang, F. Dickin and R.A. Williams, WO 95/24155.
- Object Interaction Simulation, X. Jia and R.A. Williams, WO02/029206 A3.
- Microcapsules and Methods, S.R. Biggs, R.A. Williams, O. Cayre and Q. Yuan, WO2009/037482 A2.
- Electrochemical behaviour of ferrosilicides (FexSi) in neutral and alkaline aqueous electrolytes, I: Thermodynamics of the Fe-Si-H2O system at 298K, G.H. Kelsall and R.A. Williams, Journal of the Electrochemical Society, 138, 4 (1991), pp. 931–940, ISSN 0013-4651.
- The origin of the fish-hook effect in hydrocyclone separators, E.J. Roldan-Villasana, R.A. Williams and T. Dyakowski, Powder Technology, 77 (1993), pp. 243–250, ISSN 0032-5910.
- Direct measurement of floc breakage in flowing suspensions, R.A. Williams and S.J. Peng, Journal of Colloid and Interface Science, 166 (1994), pp. 321–332, ISSN 0021-9797.
- Electrical resistance tomography of metal walled vessels and pipelines, M. Wang, F.J. Dickin and R.A. Williams, Electronics Letters, 10, 10 (1994), pp. 771–773, ISSN 0013-5194.
- Prediction of air-core size and shape in a hydrocyclone T. Dyakowski and R.A. Williams, International Journal of Mineral Processing, 43 (1995), pp. 1–14, ISSN 0301-7516.
- Controlled production of emulsions using a crossflow membrane, S.J. Peng and R.A. Williams, Particle and Particle Systems Characterization, 15, (1998), pp. 21–25, ISSN 0934-0866.
- Industrial monitoring of hydrocyclone operation using electrical resistance tomography, R.A. Williams, X. Jia, R.M. West, M. Wang, J.C. Cullivan, J. Bond, I. Faulks, T. Dyakowski, S.J. Wang, N. Climpson, J.A. Kostuch and D. Payton, Minerals Engineering, 12, 10 (1999), pp. 1245–1252, ISSN 0892-6875.
- A new method for prediction of bulk particle packing behaviour for arbitrary shaped particles in containers of any shape, R.A. Williams and X. Jia, Particulate Science and Technology, 21, 2, (2003), pp. 195–205, ISSN 0272-6351.
- Recent developments in manufacturing emulsions and particulate products using membranes, G.T.Vladisavljevic and R.A. Williams, Advances in Colloid and Interface Science, 113/1, (2005), pp. 1–20, ISSN 0001-8686.
- Heat transfer of aqueous suspensions of carbon nanotubes (CNT nanofluids), Y. Ding, H. Alias, D. Wen and R.A. Williams, International Journal of Heat and Mass Transfer, 49, 1–2, (2005), pp. 240–250, ISSN 0017-9310.
- Manufacture of large uniform droplets using rotating membrane emulsification, G.T.Vladisavljevic and R.A.Williams, Journal of Colloid and Interface Science, 299, 1, (2006), pp. 396–402, ISSN 0927-7757.
- Property predictions for packed columns using Monte Carlo and discrete element digital packing algorithms, C. Xu, X. Jia, R.A. Williams, E.H. Stitt, M. nijemeisland, S. El-Bachir, A.J. Sederman and L.F. Gladden, Computer Modelling in Engineering & Sciences, 23, (2), 117–125 (2008), ISSN 1526-1492 (print), ISSN 1526-1506 (on-line).
- European Commission Horizon 2020 Framework Programme (call no. H2020-SEMINT-1-2015). Contract 683913 "Feasibility study to determine the use of ITS technology to replace density meters in mining, dredging and other areas of hydraulic transport (2015)
