= Three-dimensional electrical capacitance tomography =

3D imaging technology

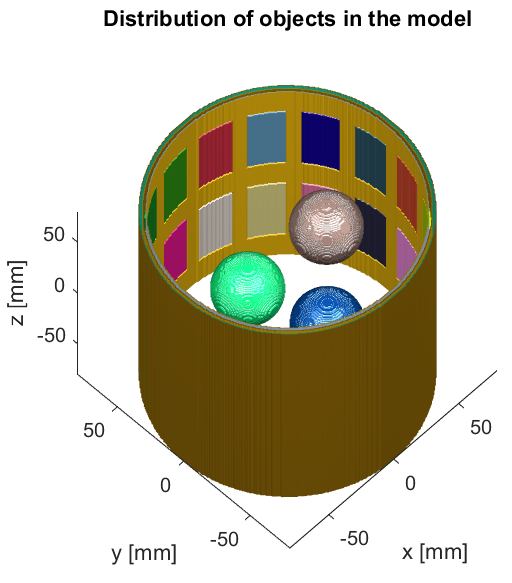
3D model of electrical tomography sensor with objects inside

Three-dimensional electrical capacitance tomography (3D ECT) also known as electrical capacitance volume tomography (ECVT) is a non-invasive 3D imaging technology applied primarily to multiphase flows. It was introduced in the early 2000s as an extension of the conventional two-dimensional ECT. In conventional electrical capacitance tomography, sensor plates are distributed around a surface of interest. Measured capacitance between plate combinations is used to reconstruct 2D images (tomograms) of material distribution. Because the ECT sensor plates are required to have lengths on the order of the domain cross-section, 2D ECT does not provide the required resolution in the axial dimension. In ECT, the fringing field from the edges of the plates is viewed as a source of distortion to the final reconstructed image and is thus mitigated by guard electrodes. 3D ECT exploits this fringing field and expands it through 3D sensor designs that deliberately establish an electric field variation in all three dimensions. In 3D tomography, the data are acquired in 3D geometry, and the reconstruction algorithm produces the three-dimensional image directly, in contrast to 2D tomography, where 3D information might be obtained by stacking 2D slices reconstructed individually.

The image reconstruction algorithms are similar in nature to ECT; nevertheless, the reconstruction problem in 3D ECT is more complicated. The sensitivity matrix of an 3D sensor is more ill-conditioned, and the overall reconstruction problem is more ill-posed compared to ECT. The 3D ECT approach to sensor design allows direct 3D imaging of the outrounded geometry. The second commonly used name electrical capacitance volume tomography (ECVT) was introduced by W. Warsito, Q. Marashdeh, and L.-S. Fan in 2007.

== Principles ==
=== Capacitance and Field Equations in 3D ECT ===
Two metal electrodes held at different electric potential $V$ and separated by a finite distance will induce an electric field $E$ in the region between and surrounding them. The field distribution is determined by the geometry of the problem and the constitutive medium properties such as permittivity $\varepsilon$ and conductivity $\sigma$. Assuming a static or quasi-static regime and the presence of a lossless dielectric medium, such as a perfect insulator, in the region between the plates, the field obeys the following equation:

$\nabla.(\varepsilon \nabla \varphi)=0$

where $\varphi$ denotes the electric potential distribution. In a homogeneous medium with uniform $\varepsilon$, this equation reduces to the Laplace equation. In a lossy medium with finite conductivity, such as water, the field obeys the generalized Ampere equation,

$\nabla \times H= \sigma E + j \omega \varepsilon E$

By taking divergence of this equation and using the fact that $E=-\nabla \varphi$, it follows:

$\nabla.((\sigma + j\omega \varepsilon)\nabla\varphi)=0$

when the plates are excited by a time-harmonic voltage potential with frequency $\omega$.

The capacitance $C$ is a measure of electric energy $W$ stored in the medium, which can be quantified via the following relation:

$W =\frac{1}{2}\int_{}^{}\varepsilon E^2\, dv = \frac{1}{2} CV^2$

where $E^2$ is the square magnitude of the electric field. The capacitance changes as a nonlinear function of the dielectric permittivity $\varepsilon$ because the electric field distribution in the above integral is also a function of $\varepsilon$.

=== Soft-Field Tomography ===
Soft-field tomography refers to a set of imaging modalities such as electrical capacitance tomography (ECT), electrical impedance tomography (EIT), electrical resistivity tomography (ERT), etc., wherein electric (or magnetic) field lines undergo changes in the presence of a perturbation in the medium. This is in contrast to hard-field tomography, such as X-ray CT, where the electric field lines do not change in the presence of a test subject. A fundamental characteristic of soft-field tomography is its ill-posedness. This contributes for making the reconstruction more challenging to achieve good spatial resolution in soft-field tomography as compared to hard-field tomography. A number of techniques, such Tikhonov regularization, can be used to alleviate the ill-posed problem. The figure at the right shows a comparison in image resolution between 3D ECT and MRI.

=== 3D ECT Measurement Acquisition Systems ===
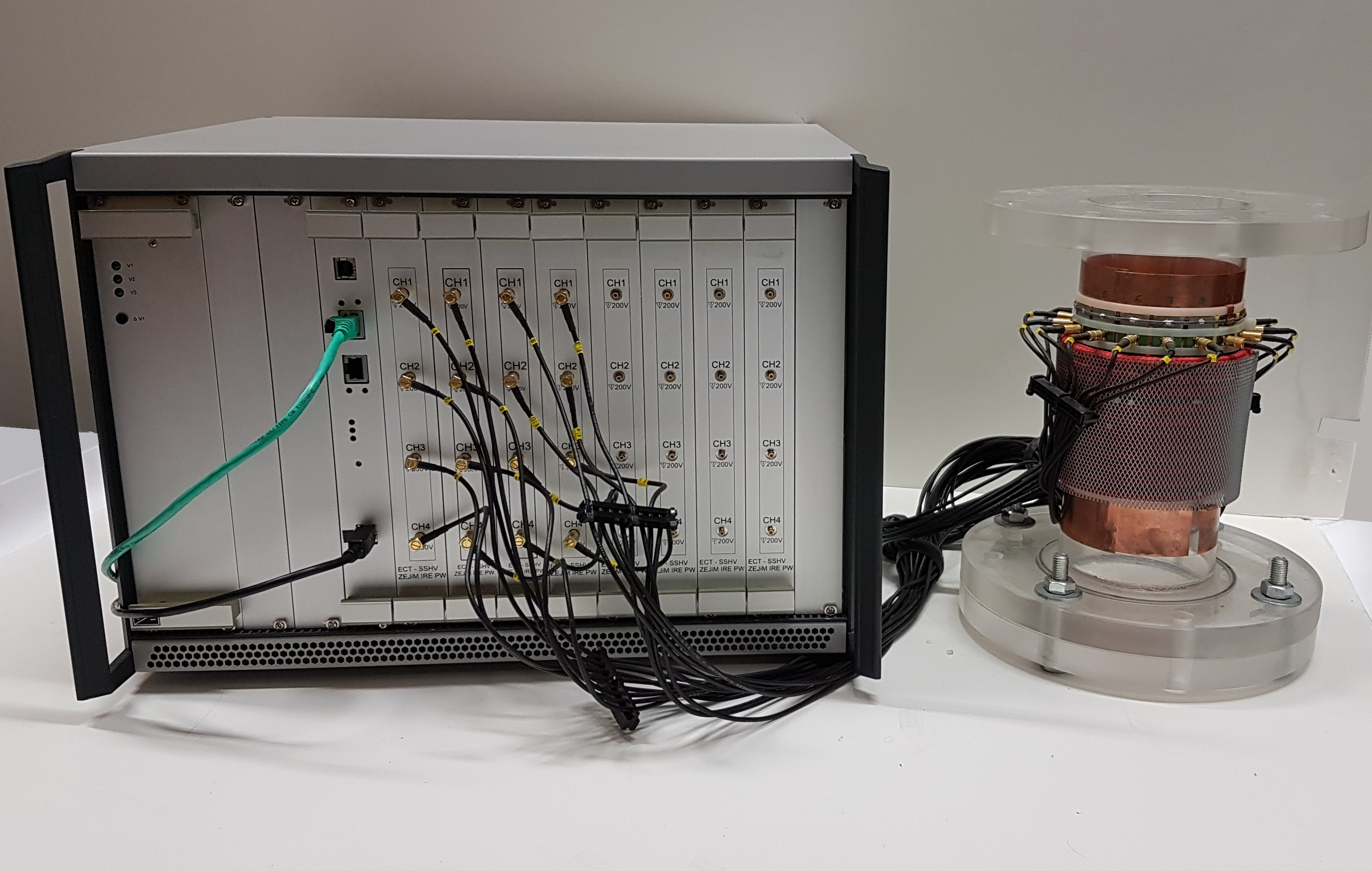
Three-dimensional electrical capacitance tomography system with connected 16-electrode sensor

The hardware of 3D ECT systems consists of sensing electrode plates, the data acquisition circuitry, and the computer to control the overall system and process the data. ECT is a non-intrusive and non-invasive imaging modality due to its contactless operation. Prior to the actual measurements, a calibration and normalization procedure is necessary to cancel out the effects of stray capacitance and any insulating wall between the electrodes and the region of interest to be imaged. After calibration and normalization, the measurements can be divided into a sequence of acquisitions where two separate electrodes are involved: one electrode (TX) is excited with AC voltage source in the quasi-electrostatic regime, typically below 10 MHz (AC method) or with pulse signal, typically lasting a few microseconds (pulse method) while a second electrode (RX) is placed at the ground potential used for measuring the resultant current. The remaining electrodes are also placed at ground potential.

This process is repeated for all possible electrode pairs. Note that reversing the roles of TX and RX electrodes would result in the same mutual capacitance due to the reciprocity. As a result, for 3D ECT systems with N number of plates, the number of independent measurement is equal to N(N-1)/2. This process is typically automated through data acquisition circuitry. Depending on the operation frequency, number of plates and frame rate per second of the measurement system, one full measurement cycle can vary; however, this is in the order of few seconds or less. One of the most critical parts of three-dimensional systems is sensor design. As the previous discussion suggests, increasing the number of electrodes also increases the amount of independent information about the region of interests. However this results in smaller electrode sizes which in turn results in low signal to noise ratio. Increasing the electrode size, on the other hand, does not result in non-uniform charge distribution over the plates, which may exacerbate the ill-posedness of the problem. The sensor dimension is also limited by the gaps between the sensing electrodes. These are important due to fringe effects. The use of guard plates between electrodes have been shown to reduce these effects. Based on the intended application, tomographic sensors can be composed of single or more layers along the axial direction. The three-dimensional tomography is not obtained from merging of 2D scans but rather from 3D discretized voxels sensitivities.

The design of the electrodes is also dictated by the shape of the domain under investigation. Some domains can be relatively simple geometries (cylindrical, rectangular prism, etc.) where symmetrical electrode placement can be used. However, complex geometries (corner joints, T-shaped domains, etc.) require specially designed electrodes to properly surround the domain. The flexibility of ECT makes it very useful for field applications where the sensing plates cannot be placed symmetrically. Since the Laplace equation lacks a characteristic length (such as the wavelength in Helmholtz equation), the fundamental physics of the 3D ECT problem is scalable in size as long as quasi-static regime properties are preserved.

=== Image Reconstruction Methods for 3D ECT ===
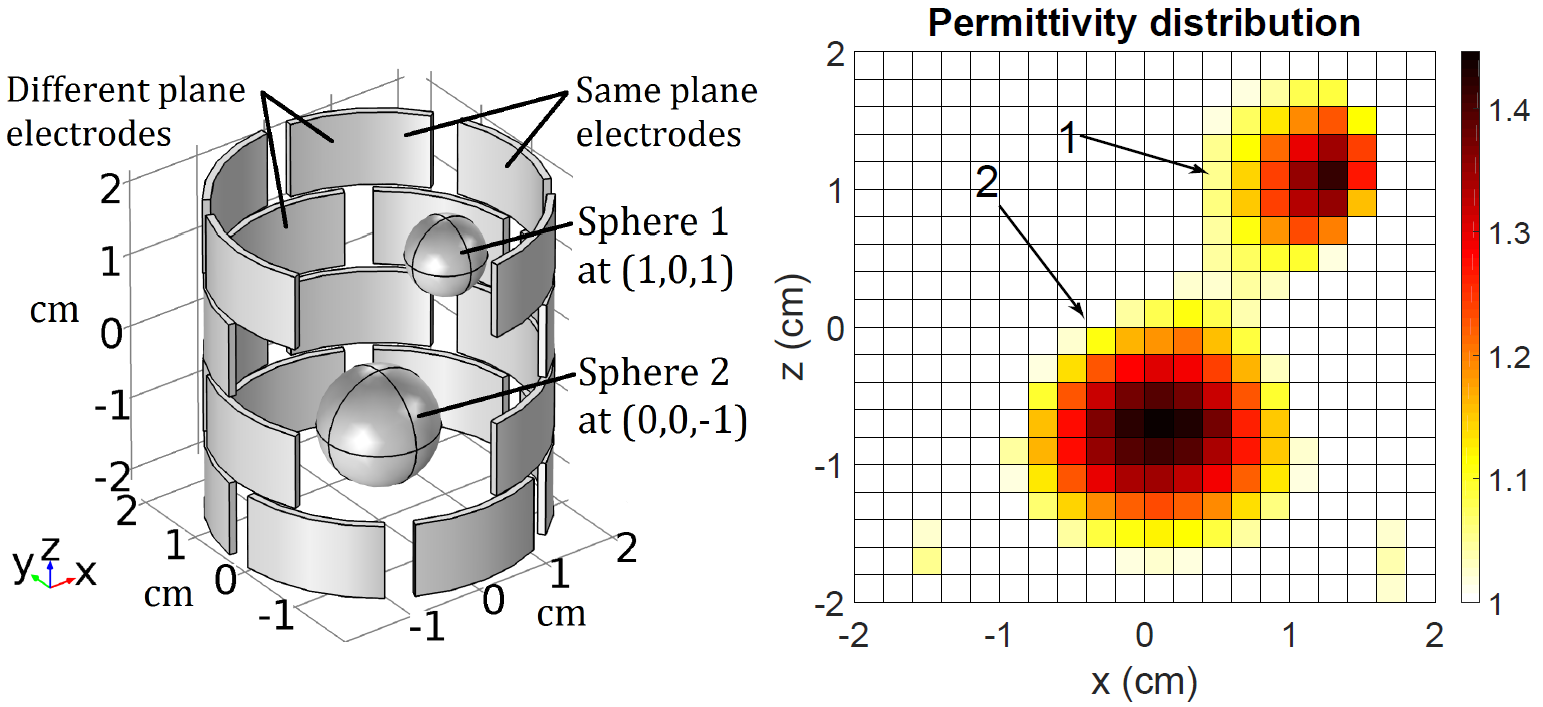
Image reconstruction in 3D ECT (a) a tomographic sensor enclosing two dielectric spheres ($\varepsilon _r = 1.5$), (b) reconstructed permittivity distribution using Landweber iteration

Reconstruction methods address the inverse problem of 3D ECT imaging, i.e. to determine the volumetric permittivity distribution form the mutual capacitance measurements. Traditionally, the inverse problem is handled through the linearization of the (nonlinear) relationship between the capacitance and the material permittivity equation using the Born approximation. Typically, this approximation is only valid for small permittivity contrasts. For other cases, the nonlinear nature of the electric field distribution poses a challenge for both 2D and 3D image reconstruction, making the reconstruction methods an active research area for better image quality. Reconstruction methods for ECT can be categorized as iterative and non-iterative (single step) methods. The examples of non-iterative methods are linear back projection (LBP), and direct method based on singular value decomposition and Tikhonov regularization. These algorithms are computationally inexpensive; however, their tradeoff is less accurate images without quantitative information. Iterative methods can be roughly classified into projection-based and optimization-based methods. Some of the linear projection iterative algorithms used for 3D ECT include Newton-Raphson, Landweber iteration and steepest descent algebraic reconstruction and simultaneous reconstruction techniques, and model-based iteration. Similar to single step methods, these algorithms also use linearized sensitivity matrix for the projections to obtain the permittivity distribution inside the domain. Projection-based iterative methods typically provide better images than non-iterative algorithms yet require more computational resources. The second type of iterative reconstruction methods are optimization-based reconstruction algorithms such as neural network optimization. These methods need more computational resources than the previously mentioned methods along with added complexity for the implementation. Optimization reconstruction methods employ multiple objective functions and use iterative process to minimize them. The resultant images contain less artifacts from the nonlinear nature and tend to be more reliable for quantitative applications.

=== Displacement-Current Phase Tomography (DCPT) ===
Displacement-Current Phase Tomography is an imaging modality that relies on the same hardware as ECT. 3D ECT does not make use of the real part (conductance component) of the obtained mutual admittance measurements. This component of the measurement is related with the material losses in the region of interest (conductivity and/or dielectric losses). DCPT utilizes the full admittance information by means of the small angle phase component of this complex valued data. DCPT can only be used when the electrodes are excited with AC voltage. It applies only to domains that include material losses, otherwise the measured phase will be zero (real part of the admittance will be zero). DCPT is designed to be used with the same reconstruction algorithms designed for 3D ECT. Therefore, DCPT can be used simultaneously with 3D ECT to image the spatial tangent loss distribution of the medium along with its spatial relative permittivity distribution from ECT.

=== Multi-Frequency 3D ECT Operation ===
Multiphase flows are invariably complex. Advanced measuring techniques are required to monitor and quantify phase hold ups in such multiphase flows. Due to their relatively fast speed of acquisition and non-intrusive characteristics, 2D and 3D ECT are widely used in industries for flow monitoring. However, the flow decomposition and monitoring capabilities of ECT for multiphase flow containing three or more phases (e.g., a combination of oil, air, and water) is somewhat limited. Multi-frequency excitations and measurements have been exploited and successfully used in ECT image reconstruction in those cases. Multi-frequency measurements allow the exploitation of the Maxwell-Wagner-Sillars (MWS) effect on the response of the measured data (e.g., admittance, capacitance, etc.) as a function of excitation frequency. This effect was first discovered by Maxwell in 1982 and later studied by Wagner and Silliars. The MWS effect is a consequence of surface migration polarization at the interface between materials when at least one of them is conducting. Typically a dielectric material presents a Debye-type relaxation effect at microwave frequencies. However, due to the presence of the MWS effect (or the MWS polarization) a mixture containing at least one conducting phase will exhibit this relaxation at much lower frequencies. The MWS effect depends on several factors such as volume fraction of each phase, phase orientation, conductivity and other mixture parameters. Wagner formula for dilute mixture and Bruggeman formula for dense mixtures are among the most notable formulation of effective dielectric constant. Hanai's formulation of complex dielectric constant, an extension of Bruggeman formula of effective dielectric constant, is instrumental in analyzing MWS effect for complex dielectric constant. Hanai's formula for complex dielectric writes as

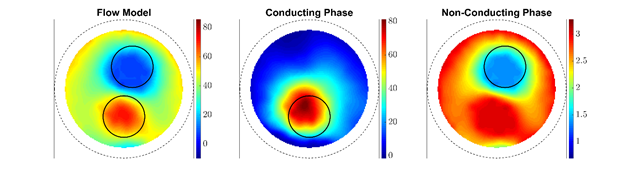
From left, reconstructed images of the flow model, conducting phase and nonconducting phase.

$\left (\frac{\varepsilon_1^*-\varepsilon_2^*}{\varepsilon_1^*-\varepsilon^*} \right )^3 \frac{\varepsilon^*}{\varepsilon_2^*}=\frac{1}{(1-\phi)^3}$

where $\varepsilon_1^*$, $\varepsilon_2^*$, and $\varepsilon^*$ are the complex effective permittivity of the dispersed phase, continuous phase, and mixture, respectively. $\phi$ is the volume fraction of the dispersed phase.

Knowing that a mixture will exhibit dielectric relaxation due to the MWS effect, this additional measuring dimension can be exploited to decompose multiphase flows when at least one of the phases is conducting. The figure to the right shows the reconstructed images of the flow model, conducting phase, and non-conducting phases extracted by exploited MWS effect from experimental data.

=== 3D ECT Velocimetry ===
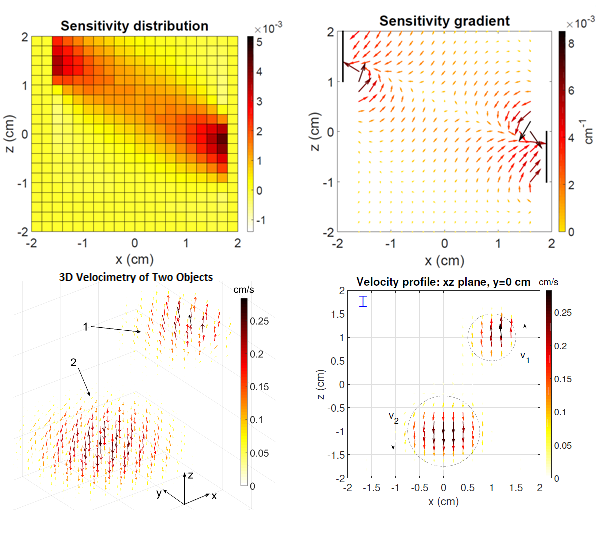
Normalized sensitivity distribution, sensitivity gradient between a pair of electrodes, reconstructed velocity profile when the spheres are moved in a 3D profile, and in a 2D profile in plane.

Velocimetry refers to techniques used to measure velocity of fluids. The use of the sensitivity gradient enables the reconstruction of 3D velocity profiles using an ECT sensor, which can readily provide information of fluid dynamics. The sensitivity gradient is defined as

$F = \nabla S = \hat{a}_x \frac{\partial S}{\partial x} + \hat{a}_y \frac{\partial S}{\partial y} + \hat{a}_z \frac{\partial S}{\partial z}$

where $S$ is the sensitivity distribution of an 3D ECT sensor as shown to the right. Upon application of the sensitivity gradient as described in, a 3D and 2D velocity profile corresponding to the figure above are shown in the figure to the right.

The application of the sensitivity gradient provides significant improvement over more traditional (cross-correlation based) velocimetry, exhibiting better image quality and requiring less computational time. Another advantage of the sensitivity gradient based velocimetry is its compatibility with conventional image reconstruction algorithms used in 3D ECT.

== Advantages ==
=== Modular ===
The basic requirements of 3D ECT sensors are simple and can therefore be very modular in design. Tomographic sensors require only conductive electrodes which are electrically isolated from one another and are also not shorted through the medium being inspected by the sensor. Additionally there must be a way to excite and detect signal to and from each electrode. The lack of constraints on the sensor design allow it to be made out of a variety of materials and take a plethora of forms including flexible walled, high temperature performance, high pressure performance, thin walled, elbowed and flat sensors. With the three-dimensional sensor electrode configuration becomes modular as well without the need to fabricate new sensors.

=== Safe ===
3D ECT is low energy, low frequency, and non-radioactive, making it safe to employ in any situation where toxic waste, high voltage, or electromagnetic radiation is a concern. The low energy nature of the technology also makes it suitable for remote locations where power is in short supply. In many occasions, a simple solar powered battery may prove sufficient to power an 3D ECT device.

=== Scalable ===
3D ECT operates on very large wavelengths, typically using frequencies below 10 MHz to excite the electrodes. These long wavelengths allow the technology to operate under the quasi-electrostatic regime. As long as the diameter of the sensor is much smaller than the length of the wave, these assumptions hold valid. For instance, when exciting with 2 MHz AC signal, the wavelength is 149.9 meters. Sensor diameters are typically designed well below this limit. Additionally, capacitance strength, $C$, scales proportionally according to electrode area, $A$, and distance between the plates, $d$, or the diameter of the sensor. So as a sensor diameter becomes larger, if the plate area scales accordingly, any given sensor design can easily be scaled up or down with minimal effect on the signal strength.

$C\varpropto \frac{A}{d}$

=== Low Cost & Profile ===
Compared to other sensing and imaging equipment such as gamma radiation, x-ray, or MRI machines, 3D ECT remains relatively cheap to manufacture and operate. Part of this quality of the technology is due to its low energy emissions which do not require any additional mechanisms of containing waste or insulating high power outputs. Adding to the low cost is the availability of a wide variety of materials to fabricate a sensor. Electronics can also be placed remotely from the sensor itself which allows for standard environment electronics to be utilized for data acquisition even when the sensor is subjected to extreme temperatures or other conditions which typically make it difficult to employ electronic instrumentation.

=== High Temporal Resolution (Fast) ===
In general terms, the method of data acquisition used alongside 3D ECT is very fast. Data can be sampled from the sensor at several thousand times per second depending on the number of plate pairs in the sensor design and the analog design of the data acquisition system (i.e. clock speed, parallel circuitry, etc.). The potential for collecting data very quickly makes the technology very attractive to industries which have processes that occur very quickly or transport at high speeds. This is a great contrast to MRI which has high spatial resolution but often very poor temporal resolution.

== Challenges for Spatial Resolution in 3D ECT ==
Spatial resolution is a fundamental challenge in 2D and 3D ECT. The spatial resolution is limited by the soft-field nature of ECT and the fact that the interrogating electric field is quasi-static in nature. The latter property implies that the potential distribution between the plates is a solution of Laplace equation. As a consequence, there cannot be any relative minima or maxima for the potential distribution between the plates and hence no focal spots can be produced.

In order to increase spatial resolution, two basic strategies can be pursued. The first strategy consists of enriching the measurement data. This can be done by (a) adaptive acquisitions with synthetic electrodes, (b) spatio-temporal sampling using additional measurements obtained when objects are in different positions inside the sensor, (c) multi-frequency operation to exploit permittivity variations with frequency due to the MWS effect, and (d) combining ECT with other sensing modalities, either based on the same hardware (such as DCPT) or on additional hardware (such as microwave tomography). The second strategy to increase spatial resolution consists in the development of multi-stage image reconstruction that incorporate a priori information and training data sets, and spatial adaptivity.

== Applications ==
=== Multi-Phase Flow ===
Multi-phase flow refers to simultaneous flow of materials of different physical states or chemical compositions, and is heavily involved in petroleum, chemical and biochemical industries. In the past, 3D ECT has been extensively tested in a wide range of multi-phase flow systems in laboratory as well as industrial settings. ECT's unique ability to obtain real-time non-invasive spatial visualization of systems with complex geometries under different temperature and pressure conditions at relatively low costs renders it favorable for both fundamental fluid mechanics research and applications in large-scale processing industries. Recent research efforts in exploring these two aspects are summarized below.

==== Gas-Solid ====
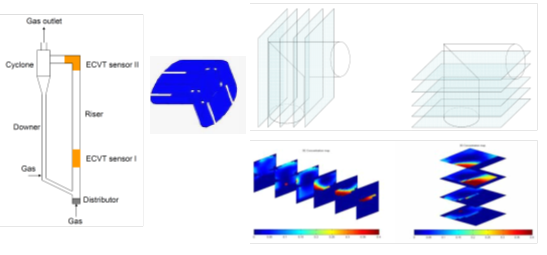
Illustration of the CFB reactor (left), ECT sensor configuration at the bend (middle), and reconstructed images of the solids holdup distribution in the bend (right).

Gas-solid fluidized bed is a typical gas-solid flow system, and has been widely employed in chemical industries due to its superior heat and mass transfer and solid transport and handling. 3D ECT has been successfully applied to gas-solid fluidized bed systems for system properties measurements and dynamic behaviors visualization. An example is the study of choking phenomenon in a 0.1 m ID gas-solid circulating fluidized bed with a 12-channel cylindrical ECT sensor, where the formation of slug during transition to choking is clearly recorded by 3D ECT. Another experiment studies the bubbling gas-solid fluidization in a 0.05 ID column, where the solid holdup, bubble shape and frequency obtained from ECT are validated with MRI measurements. The flexibility of the 3D ECT sensor geometry also enables it for imaging of bend, tapering and other non-uniform sections of gas-solid flow reactors. For example, a horizontal gas jet penetrating into a cylindrical gas-solid fluidized bed can be imaged with a modified 3D ECT sensor, and information such as penetration length and width of the jet as well as jet coalescence behavior with the bubbles in the fluidized bed can be obtained from 3D ECT.

Another example is 3D ECT imaging of the riser and bend of a gas-solid circulating fluidized bed (CFB). A core-annulus flow structure in both the riser and the bend and a solid accumulation in the horizontal section of the bend are identified from quantitative images.

==== Gas-Liquid ====
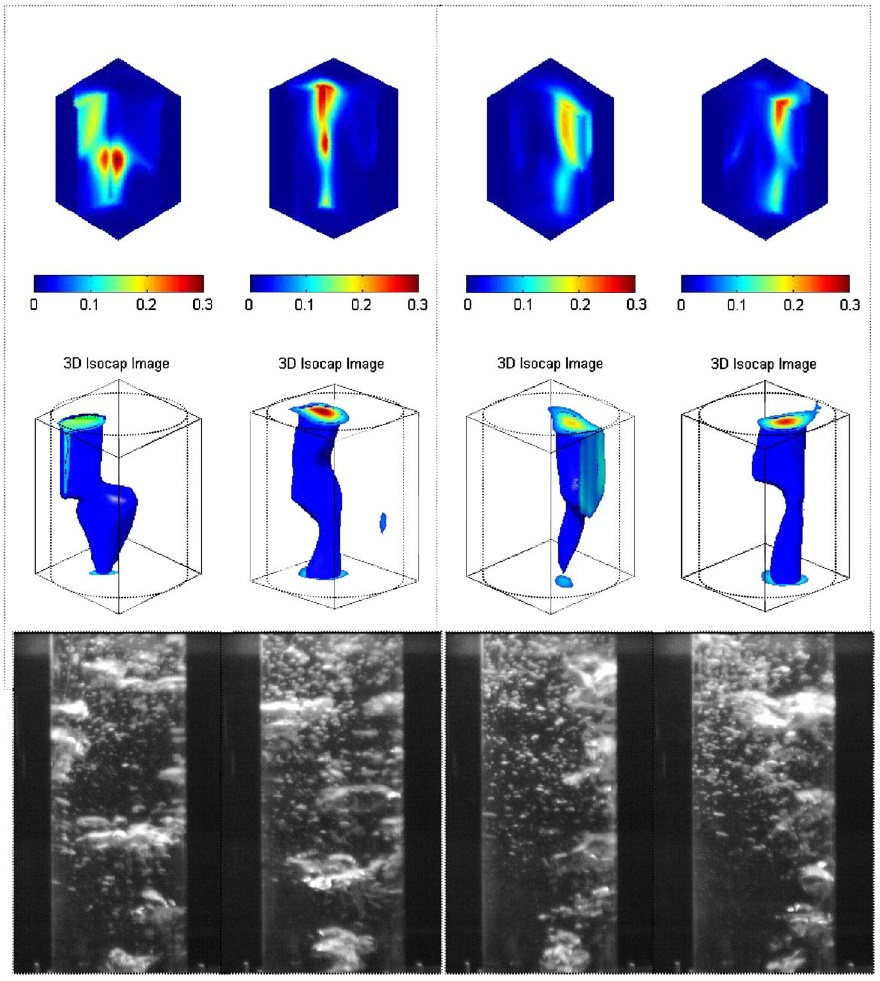
Images of the bubble plumes from 3D ECT (top) and the actual column (bottom).

Gas-liquid bubble column is a typical gas-liquid flow system that is widely used in petrochemical and biochemical processes. The bubbling flow phenomena have been extensively researched with computational fluid dynamic methods as well as traditional invasive measurement techniques. ECT possesses the unique ability to obtain real-time quantitative visualization of an entire gas-liquid flow field. An example is the study of the dynamics of spiral bubble plumes in bubble columns. 3D ECT is shown to be able to capture the spiral motion of bubble plumes, the structures of large scale liquid vortices and gas holdup distributions.

Another example of the application of 3D ECT in gas-liquid systems is the study of a cyclonic gas-liquid separator, where a gas-liquid mixture enters a horizontal column tangentially and creates a swirling flow field where gas and liquid is separated by centrifugal force. ECT successfully captures the liquid distribution inside the vessel and the off-centered gas core drifting phenomenon. The quantitative results match mechanistic models.

==== Gas-Liquid-Solid ====
The trickle bed reactor (TBR) is a typical three-phase gas-liquid-solid system, and has applications in petroleum, petrochemical, biochemical, electrochemical and water treatment industries. In a TBR, gas and liquid flow downward concurrently through packed solid materials. Depending on the gas and liquid flow rates, TBR can have different flow regimes, including trickling flow, pulsating flow and dispersed-bubble flow. 3D ECT has been successfully used to image the turbulent pulsating flow in a TBR, and detailed pulse structure and pulse velocity can be obtained.

=== Combustion (High Temperature and Flame) ===
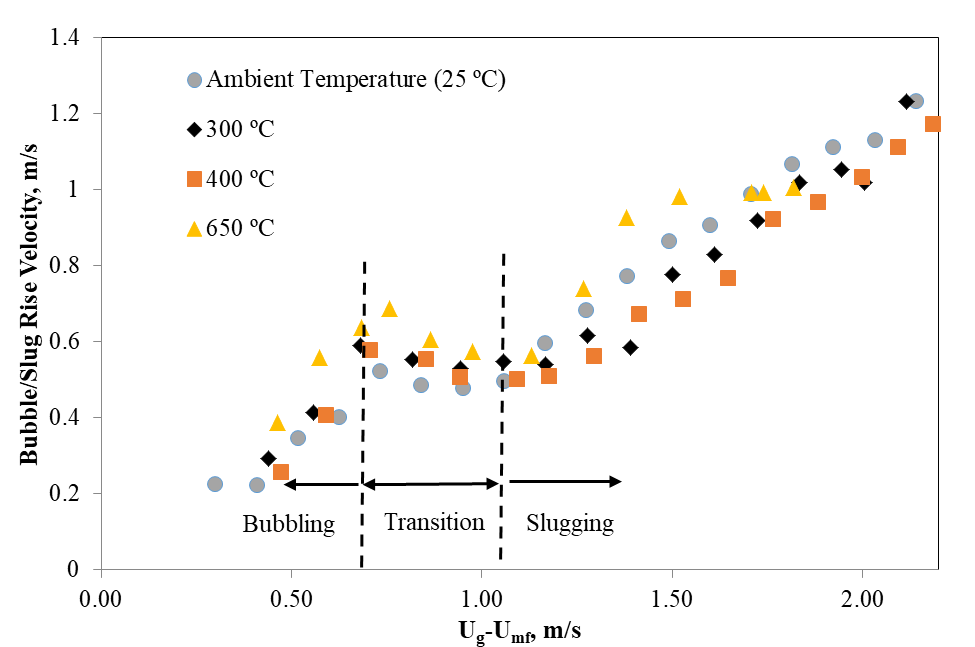
Slug Velocities at varying Ug-Umf for various temperatures, 25°C, 300°C, 400°C, and 650°C.

Most of the gas-solid flow systems in chemical industries operate at elevated temperatures for optimal reaction kinetics. Under such harsh conditions, many laboratory measurement techniques are no longer available. However, ECT has the potential for high-temperature applications due to its simple and robust design and non-invasive nature, which allows for insulating materials to be imbedded in the sensor for heat-resistance. Currently the high-temperature 3D ECT technology is under rapid development and research efforts are being made to address engineering issues associated with high temperatures.

3D ECT has been utilized in environments of high temperatures up to 650 °C to image and characterize fluidized beds under high temperatures such as those used in fluidized bed reactors, fluid catalytic cracking and fluidized bed combustion. The application of this technology to high temperature fluidized beds has allowed the in-depth analysis of how temperature affects flow behavior in the beds. For instance, in a slugging fluidized bed with large column height to column diameter ratio with Geldart Group D particles, increasing temperature up to 650 °C can change the density and viscosity of the gas, but has negligible effect on slugging behavior such as slug velocity and frequency.

=== Non-Destructive Testing (NDT) ===
In the infrastructure inspection industry, it is desirable to use equipment that inspects embedded components non-invasively. Issues such as corroded steel, water penetration, and air voids are often embedded within concrete or other solid members. Here, non-destructive testing (NDT) methods must be used to avoid compromising the integrity of the structure. 3D ECT has been used in this field for the non-destructive testing of external tendons on post-tensioned bridges. These structures are filled with steel cables and protective grouting or grease.

In this application, a mobilized, remotely-controlled 3D ECT device is placed around the external tendon and scans the interior of the tendon. The tomographic device can then decipher information about the quality of the grouting or grease within the tendon in real time. It can also determine the size and location of any air voids or moisture within the tendon. Finding these issues is a critical task for bridge inspectors, as air and moisture pockets within the tendons can lead to corrosion of steel cables and failure of the tendon, which puts the bridge at risk of structural damage.

== See also ==
- Electrical capacitance tomography
- Electrical impedance tomography
- Electrical resistivity tomography
- Process tomography
