= Boundary estimation in EIT =

Boundary estimation in EIT is the term used in the field of electrical impedance tomography, if the inverse problem is the estimation of boundary instead of the conductivity distribution inside an object domain.

== Theory ==
Electrical impedance tomography (EIT) is a non-invasive imaging modality in which a cross sectional image of the conductivity distribution inside an object can be obtained by injecting a set of current patterns and measuring boundary voltages across the electrodes attached to the surface of the object. If the conductivity values of all the regions inside the object are assumed to be known a priori then the inverse problem in EIT becomes the estimation of shape, size and location of the underlying regions. Such a problem is often known as the boundary estimation problem in EIT.

== Categories of boundary estimation in EIT ==
The boundary estimation problem in EIT can be broadly categorized into two classes according to the topology of the boundary to be estimated: closed boundary problems, in which the anomalies are enclosed by a background substance, and the open boundary problems in which the domain is divided into two or more disjoint regions which are separated by an open boundary.

Several closed boundary estimation approaches have been devised in the literature, In one of the most popular techniques, the boundaries of the regions enclosed inside a domain are considered to be smooth enough so that they can be expressed using coefficients of truncated Fourier series.

The open boundaries, usually referred to as the interface boundaries, are often represented using front points spaced discretely along the interface.

== Applications ==
The applications of EIT boundary estimation are in the field of medical imaging as well as the monitoring of the industrial processes.

=== EIT boundary Estimation applied to medical imaging ===
The conductivity estimation using EIT is a nonlinear ill-posed problem. In medical imaging we are often interested in the estimation of organ boundaries rather than the conductivity distribution inside the human body. The poor spatial resolution of EIT makes it difficult to estimate the organ boundaries, thus undermining its anatomical significance. If the conductivity values inside a specific region of the human body, such as that of thorax region, are assumed to be known a priori then the inverse problem in EIT becomes the estimation of shape, size and location of the internal organs. It consequently leads to a much lesser ill-posed problem and significantly reduces the dimension of the solution space,.

=== EIT boundary Estimation applied to industrial process monitoring ===
The applications of EIT in the process industry include monitoring the multi-phase flow in the process pipelines sedimentation monitoring, etc.
