= John G. Webster =

American electrical engineer

John G. Webster was an American electrical engineer and a founding pioneer in the field of biomedical engineering. In 2008, Professor Webster was awarded the University of Wisconsin, College of Engineering, Polygon Engineering Council Outstanding Instructor Award. In 2019, the Institute of Electrical and Electronics Engineers awarded him its James H. Mulligan Jr. Educational Medal for his career contributions. Professor Webster died on March 29, 2023.

== Education ==
- 1953 B.Sc. (Elec. Eng.) Cornell University
- 1965 M.Sc. (Elec. Eng.) University of Rochester
- 1967 PhD (Elec. Eng.) University of Rochester

== Educational Experiments ==
- 1953–54 Fulbright Fellow, Ludwig-Maximilians-Universität München
- 1963–67 NIH Predoctoral Fellow, University of Rochester, NY
- 1967 Instructor in Electrical Engineering, University of Rochester, NY
- 1967–70 Assistant Professor of Electrical Engineering, University of Wisconsin-Madison
- 1970 ASEE-NASA Summer Faculty Fellow, Stanford-Ames
- 1970–73 Associate Professor of Electrical Engineering, University of Wisconsin-Madison
- 1976–80 Director of Biomedical Engineering Ctr., University of Wisconsin-Madison
- 1973–1999 Professor of Electrical and Computer Engineering, University of Wisconsin-Madison
- 1999–2001 Professor of Biomedical Engineering, University of Wisconsin-Madison
- 2001–2023 Professor Emeritus of Biomedical Engineering, University of Wisconsin-Madison Supervised 24 Ph.D. and 67 M.S. theses

== Industrial Experiments ==
- 1954–55 Research Engineer, North American Aviation
- 1955–59 Head, Instrumentation Group, Boeing Airplane Co.
- 1959–61 Head, Telemetry System Test Group, Radiation, Inc.
- 1961–62 Staff Engineer, Display Group, Mitre Corp.
- 1962–63 Staff Engineer, Computer Display, IBM Corp.
- 2005–2023 Director of Research, Bahr Management, Inc.

== Professional Society Activities ==
- 1979–85 Associate Editor of IEEE Transactions on Biomedical Engineering
- 1979–84 Administrative Committee of IEEE Engineering in Medicine and Biology Society
- 1979–93 Instrumentation Section Co-editor of Annals of Biomedical Engineering
- 1987 present Editorial Board of Medical & Biological Engineering & Computing
- 1987–2008 Editorial Board of Physiological Measurement
- 1990–95 Editorial Review Board of Journal of Clinical Engineering
- 1988–89 Chairman of Fellows Committee of IEEE Engineering in Medicine and Biology Society
- 1990–91 Nominating Committee of IEEE Engineering in Medicine and Biology Society
- 1999–2000 Fellows Committee of IEEE Engineering in Medicine and Biology Society

== Books ==
1. Jacobson, B., and J. G. Webster, Medicine and clinical engineering, Prentice-Hall, Englewood Cliffs, NJ, 1977.
2. Webster, J. G. and A. M. Cook (eds.), Clinical engineering: principles and practices, Prentice-Hall, Englewood Cliffs, NJ, 1979.
3. Tompkins, W. J., and J. G. Webster (eds.), Design of microcomputer-based medical instrumentation, Prentice-Hall, Englewood Cliffs, NJ, 1981.
4. Cook, A. M., and J. G. Webster (eds.), Therapeutic medical devices: application and design, Prentice-Hall, Englewood Cliffs, NJ, 1982.
5. Webster, J. G., A. M. Cook, W. J. Tompkins, and G. C. Vanderheiden (eds.), Electronic devices for rehabilitation, Wiley, New York, 1985.
6. Tompkins, W. J., and J. G. Webster (eds.), Interfacing sensors to the IBM PC, Prentice all, Englewood Cliffs, NJ, 1988.
7. Webster, J. G. (ed.), Tactile sensors for robotics and medicine, John Wiley & Sons, New York, 1988.
8. Webster, J. G., Transducers and sensors, An IEEE/EAB Individual Learning Program, IEEE, Piscataway, NJ, 1989.
9. Webster, J. G. (ed.), Electrical impedance tomography, Adam Hilger, Bristol, England, 1990.
10. Webster, J. G. (ed.), Teaching design in electrical engineering, Educational Activities Board, IEEE, Piscataway, NJ, 1990.
11. Webster, J. G. (ed.), Prevention of pressure sores: engineering and clinical aspects, Adam Hilger, Bristol, England, 1991.
12. Webster, J. G. (ed.), Design of cardiac pacemakers, IEEE Press, Piscataway, NJ, 1995.
13. Webster, J. G. (ed.), Design of pulse oximeters, IOP Publishing, Bristol, UK, 1997.
14. Pallás-Areny, R., and J. G. Webster, Analog signal processing, John Wiley & Sons, New York, 1999.
15. Webster, J. G. (ed.), The measurement, instrumentation and sensors handbook, CRC Press, Boca Raton, FL, 1999.
16. Webster, J. G. (ed.), Encyclopedia of electrical and electronic engineering, John Wiley & Sons, New York, 1999.
17. Webster, J. G. (ed.), Mechanical variables measurement: solid, fluid, and thermal, CRC Press, Boca Raton, FL, 2000.
18. Pallás-Areny, R., and J. G. Webster, Sensors and signal conditioning, Second edition, John Wiley & Sons, New York, 2001.
19. Webster, J. G. (ed.), Minimally invasive medical technology, IOP Publishing, Bristol, UK, 2001. John G. Webster 17
20. Webster, J. G. (ed.), Electrical measurement, signal processing, and displays, CRC Press, Boca Raton, FL, 2004.
21. Webster, J. G. (ed.), Bioinstrumentation, John Wiley & Sons, New York, 2004.
22. Webster, J. G. (ed.), Encyclopedia of medical devices and instrumentation, Second edition, John Wiley & Sons, New York, 2006.
23. Webster, J. G. (ed.), Medical instrumentation: application and design, Fourth edition, John Wiley & Sons, Hoboken, NJ, 2009.

Medical Instrumentation: Application and Design is considered the classic textbook in the field.

== Honors and awards ==
- 2010 Emeritus Fellow, Biomedical Engineering Society
- 2008 University of Wisconsin, College of Engineering, Polygon Engineering Council Outstanding Instructor Award
- 2005 Fellow, World Innovation Foundation
- 2004 Thomson ISI Highly Cited
- 2001 IEEE EMBS Career Achievement Award
- 2000 University of Wisconsin, College of Engineering, Benjamin Smith Reynolds Award for Excellence in Teaching Engineers
- 2000 University of Wisconsin, College of Engineering, Polygon Engineering Council Outstanding Instructor Award
- 2000 IEEE Third Millennium Medal
- 1999 Fellow, Institute of Physics
- 1999 ASEE/Engineering Libraries Division, Award for Best Reference Work
- 1999 University of Wisconsin, College of Engineering, Polygon Engineering Council Outstanding Instructor Award
- 1999 University of Wisconsin, Department of Electrical and Computer Engineering, Holdridge Award for Excellence in Teaching
- 1996 Association for the Advancement of Medical Instrumentation, AAMI Foundation Laufman-Greatbatch Prize
- 1996 University of Wisconsin Chancellor's Award for Excellence in Teaching
- 1994 ASEE/Biomedical Engineering Division, Theo C. Pilkington Outstanding Educator Award
- 1993 ASEE Centennial Certificate of Recognition
- 1992 Fellow, American Institute for Medical and Biological Engineering
- 1986–90 NIH Surgery and Bioengineering Study Section
- 1986 Fellow, Institute of Electrical and Electronics Engineers, 1997 Life Fellow
- 1979 Fellow, Instrument Society of America, 1994 Life FellowJohn G. Webster 3
- 1978 ASEE Western Electric Fund Award
- 1974 ISA Donald P. Eckman Education Award
- 1971–76 NIH Research Career Development Award

Webster was currently professor emeritus in the College of Engineering at the University of Wisconsin–Madison. He last taught Biomedical Engineering 310: Introduction to Bioinstrumentation during spring 2015.

He first proposed the idea of electrical impedance tomography as a medical imaging technique in a publication in 1978.

In his spare time, Webster worked with undergraduate biomedical engineering design teams at the University of Wisconsin-Madison, including ongoing projects with impedance cardiography and atrial fibrillation.
