= Brian H. Brown =

British physicist

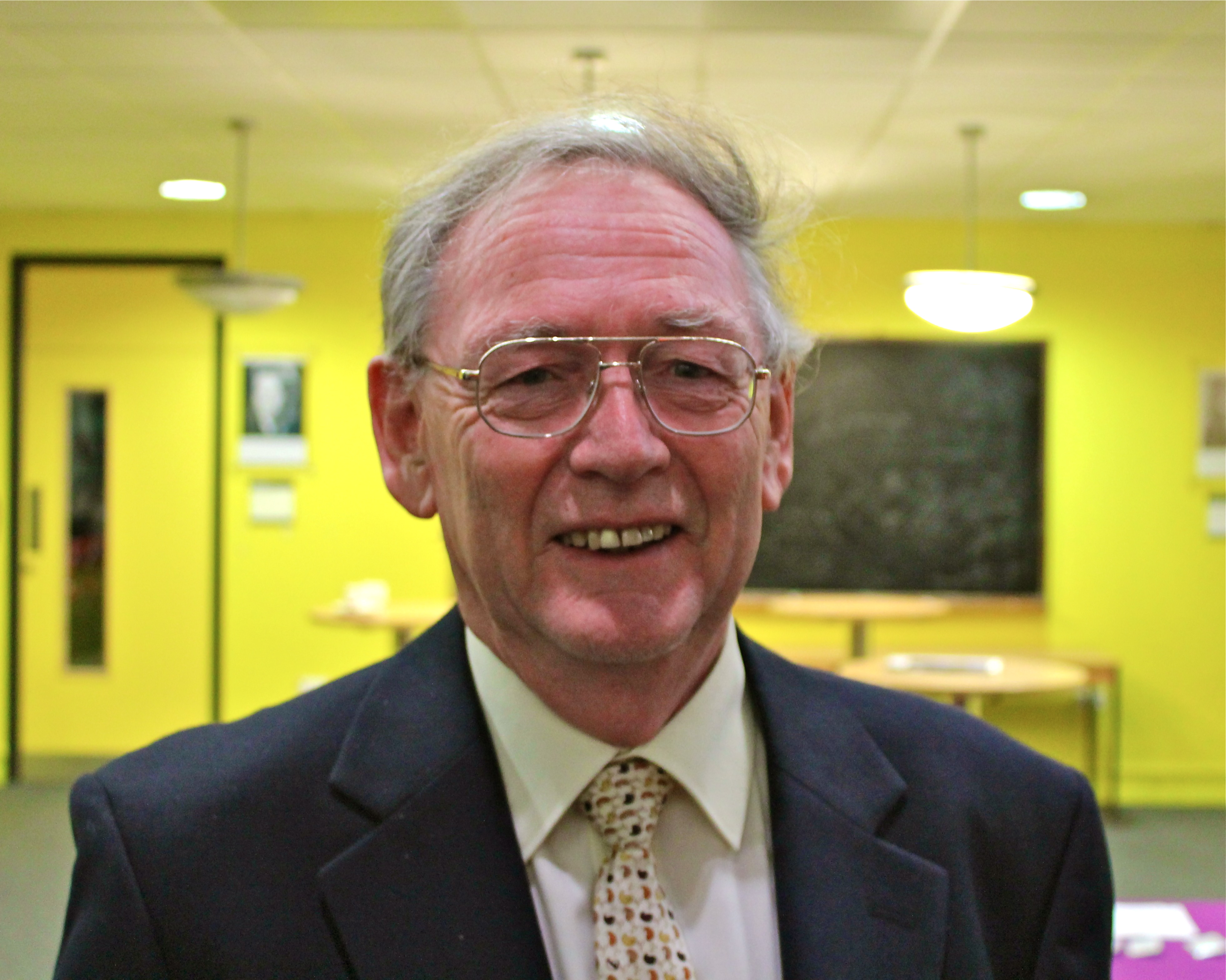
Prof. Brian H. Brown in Manchester, UK (November 2012)

Brian H. Brown is a medical physicist specialising in medical electronics. He is especially well known for his pioneering work with David C. Barber on electrical impedance tomography (EIT). He is also noted for his work on the recording and understanding of the electrical activity of the gut, the analysis of nerve action potentials, the use of electromyography to investigate and identify carriers of muscular dystropy and the development of aids for the profoundly deaf. More recently he has carried out research on the use of Electrical Impedance Spectroscopy to identify early cervical cancer.

He has contributed to about 290 scientific publications, patents and books and is currently Professor Emeritus at the University of Sheffield.

Brown graduated in Physics from the University of London in 1962 and subsequently completed his PhD in neurophysiology from the University of Sheffield. After graduation, he worked as a Development Engineer with Pye Ltd. in Cambridge and subsequently as a Heath Physicist at Berkeley Nuclear Power Station. Later he was employed for a year as a UN Expert in Medical Electronics in Hyderabad, India. He subsequently was appointed to a chair in Medical Physics in Sheffield. He took partial-retirement in 2002 from his post as Chairman of the Department of Medical Physics and Clinical Engineering at Sheffield Teaching Hospitals and the University of Sheffield.

Brown has won numerous awards and prizes in recognition of his work including the Herman P. Schwan Award for Pioneering Research into Electrical Impedance Tomography
