= Membrane emulsification =

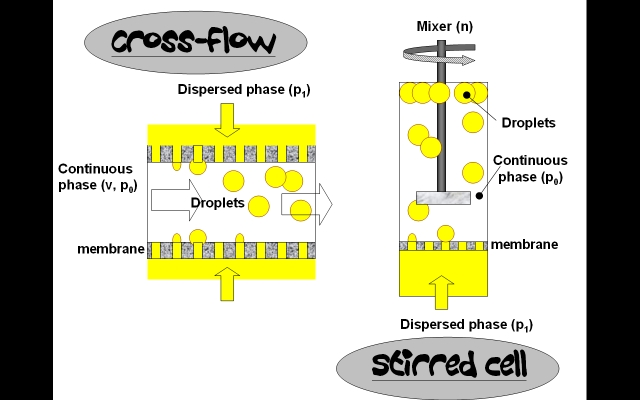
Schematic figure of cross-flow membrane emulsification

Membrane emulsification (ME) is a relatively novel technique for producing all types of single and multiple emulsions for DDS (drug delivery systems), solid micro carriers for encapsulation of drug or nutrient, solder particles for surface-mount technology, mono dispersed polymer microspheres (for analytical column packing, enzyme carriers, liquid crystal display spacers, toner core particles). Membrane emulsification was introduced by Nakashima and Shimizu in the late 1980s in Japan.

== Description ==
In this process, the dispersed phase is forced through the pores of a microporous membrane directly into the continuous phase. Emulsified droplets are formed and detached at the end of the pores with a drop-by-drop mechanism. The advantages of membrane emulsification over conventional emulsification processes are that it enables one to obtain very fine emulsions of controlled droplet sizes and narrow droplet size distributions. Successful emulsification can be carried out with much less consumption of emulsifier and energy, and because of the lowered shear stress effect, membrane emulsification allows the use of shear-sensitive ingredients, such as starch and proteins. The membrane emulsification process is generally carried out in cross-flow (continuous or batch) mode or in a stirred cell (batch).

A major limiting factor of ME was the low dispersed phase flux. In order to expand the industrial applications, the productivity of this method had to be increased. Some research has been aimed at solving this problem and others, such as membrane fouling.

High dispersed phase flux has now been shown to be possible using single-pass annular gap crossflow membranes.
