= Industrial Tomography Systems =

Industrial Tomography Systems plc
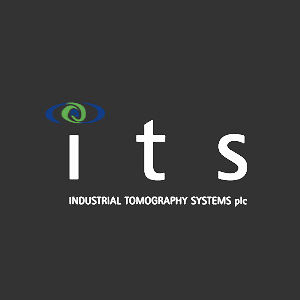
- Type: Public
- Founded: 2001
- Headquarters: Manchester, UK
- Number of locations: 2
- Area served: Global
- Key people: Ken Primrose, CEO Richard Williams, Founder
- Products: Industrial process imaging tools
- Website: www.itoms.com

Industrial Tomography Systems plc, occasionally abbreviated to ITOMS or simply ITS, is a manufacturer of process visualization systems based upon the principles of tomography. Headquartered in Manchester, UK, the company provides instrumentation to a variety of organisations across a range of sectors; including oil refining, chemical manufacturing, nuclear engineering, dairy manufacturing, and research/academia.

== History ==
Industrial Tomography Systems began as an incubator company in 1997, responsible for commercializing technologies developed by University of Manchester Institute of Science and Technology. Founders included a number of academics who had helped to develop tomography technology, such as Professors Brian Hoyle and Mi Wang (of University of Leeds) and Professor Richard Williams (then of Camborne School of Mines); as well as Ken Primrose, who continues to function as CEO as of late-2016. Currently, Industrial Tomography Systems has over a dozen staff based in the company's headquarters (located just off one of Manchester's major thoroughfares), and has systems installed in a number of global companies, including Johnson Matthey, and GlaxoSmithKline and Nestlé. In addition, the company has collaborated with major engineering firms, such as Philadelphia Mixers, to host international tomography workshops that showcase its technologies. In 2011, Industrial Tomography Systems was recognised as a "global leader in its field" after it was short-listed in the Institution of Engineering and Technology Innovation Awards. In an interview with the Manchester Evening News, Primrose attributed the success of the company to being able to offer tailored solutions that are designed to meet the needs of individual applications, as well as having a coordinated network of international distributors and agents.

== Products ==
Industrial Tomography Systems' scanning technology works on a similar principle to CAT scanners that are used in hospitals to see inside the human body: by passing an electric current very rapidly between pairs of electrodes that are in contact with the process media, real-time images of the industrial process can be extrapolated from measuring the resulting difference in voltages. Since 2001, the company has developed a range of instruments based upon different types of tomography, which are outlined below.

=== EIT and ERT Systems ===
Industrial Tomography Systems' instrumentation that utilizes the principles of electrical impedance tomography & electrical resistance tomography (the two terms are often used interchangeably) include: z8000, p2+, and v5r. These systems have been used to visualize processes involving mixing, crystallization, bubble columns, packed beds, flows, and separations.

=== ECT Systems ===
Electrical capacitance tomography instruments released by the company include: m3000c, m3000dual (combines ERT measurements with ECT), and m3c. These instruments are used when the phases in a process are non-conducting, with readings instead based upon electrical permittivity rather than electrical conductivity. As such, ECT instruments can be used in similar processes to those where ERT is deployed, including flows, fluidized beds, and pneumatic conveying.

=== Ultrasound Systems ===
Until mid-2013, Industrial Tomography Systems supported one instrument based upon ultrasound spectroscopy technology: the u2s.

=== Dens-itometer ===
In 2015, Industrial Tomography Systems launched their industry changing Densitometer, a system which uses no nuclear power sources. Based on electrical resistance tomography, this new measurement system can take data independent of flow regime and also concentration of measure materials which are neutrally buoyant. The instrument is supplied as a pipe based sensor and a standard IP67 instrument enclosure (600x600x300mm). The device has gone on to make a huge impact in the dredging sector, due to its environmentally friendly technology.

=== Mix-itometer ===
Years of listening to industry professionals complain about their batch mixers has prompted ITS to develop the Mix-itometer, which utilises tomography solutions to resolve mixing problems. The Mix-itometer probe when placed inside batch mixers, replacing an existing baffle, measures average concentration and a mixing index by surveying more than 200 locations inside the process vessel. Mix-itometer software provides users with a visual representation of mixing upon a PC-based interface; the instrumentation produces real time volumetric imagery which gives producers a vividly detailed look of what occurs inside batch mixers.

== Industrial applications ==
Findings published in AAPS's PharmSciTech in 2005 indicate that Industrial Tomography Systems' technology is able to monitor (1) the on-line measurement of solids distributed in a stirred tank, (2) crystallization, (3) the performance of industrial pressure filters, and (4) flow profiles and velocity measurements. Additionally Primrose claims that, due to the non-invasive nature of tomography technology, it can be used to create images of industrial processes in hard-to-reach places, such as in pipelines that contain radioactive/toxic materials.

== See also ==
- Fluid dynamics
- Mettler Toledo
- Multiphase flow
