= Electrical resistivity tomography =

Geophysical technique for imaging sub-surface structures

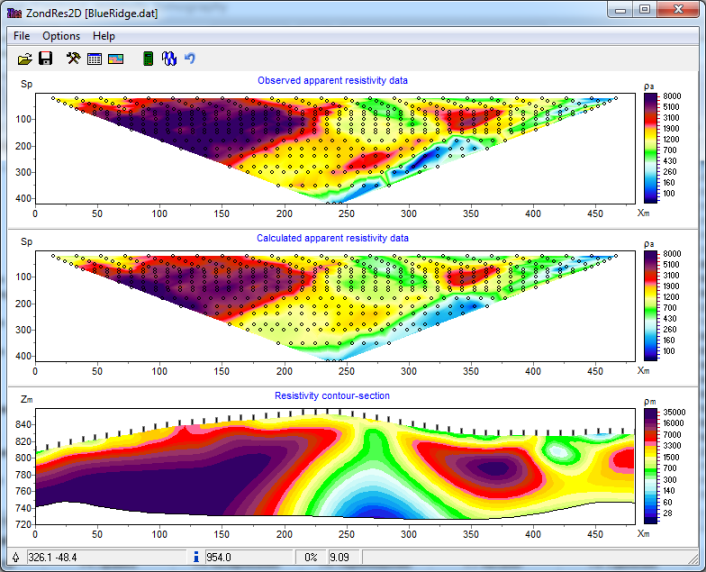
2D resistivity inversion of ERT data

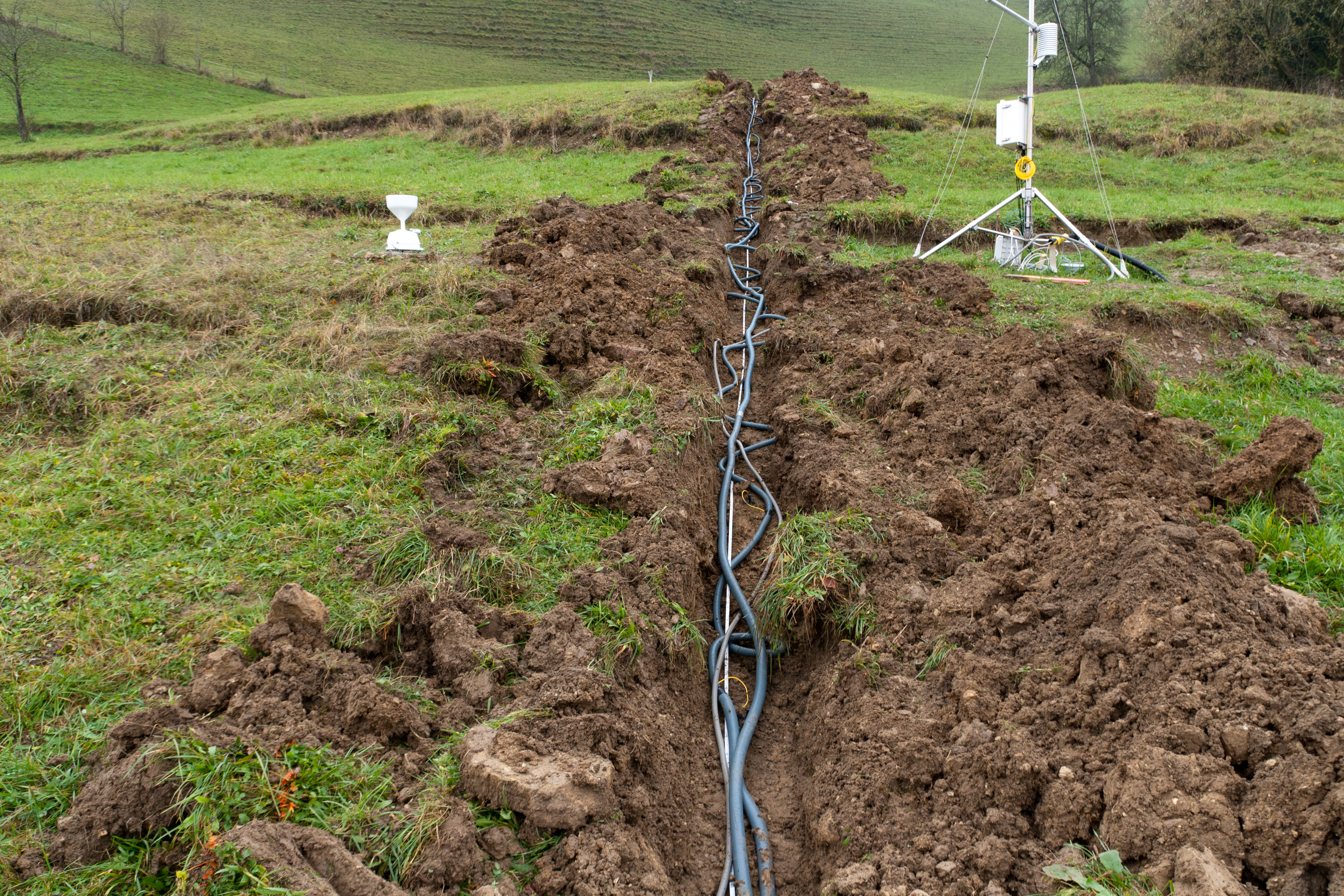
Deployment of a permanent electrical resistivity tomography profile on a longitudinal section of an active landslide.

Electrical resistivity tomography (ERT) or electrical resistivity imaging (ERI) is a geophysical technique for imaging sub-surface structures from electrical resistivity measurements made at the surface, or by electrodes in one or more boreholes. If the electrodes are suspended in the boreholes, deeper sections can be investigated. It is closely related to the medical imaging technique electrical impedance tomography (EIT), and mathematically is the same inverse problem. In contrast to medical EIT, however, ERT is essentially a direct current method. A related geophysical method, induced polarization (or spectral induced polarization), measures the transient response and aims to determine the subsurface chargeability properties.

Electrical resistivity measurements can be used for identification and quantification of depth of groundwater, detection of clays, and measurement of groundwater conductivity.

== History ==
The technique evolved from techniques of electrical prospecting that predate digital computers, where layers or anomalies were sought rather than images.

Early work on the mathematical problem in the 1930s assumed a layered medium (see for example Langer, Slichter). Andrey Nikolayevich Tikhonov who is best known for his work on regularization of inverse problems also worked on this problem. He explains in detail how to solve the ERT problem in a simple case of 2-layered medium. During the 1940s, he collaborated with geophysicists and without the aid of computers they discovered large deposits of copper. As a result, they were awarded a State Prize of Soviet Union.

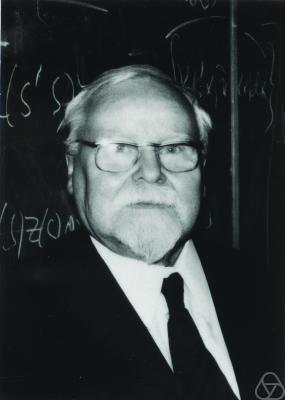
Andrey Nikolayevich Tikhonov, the "father of ERT".

When adequate computers became widely available, the inverse problem of ERT could be solved numerically. The work of Loke and Barker at Birmingham University was among the first such solution and their approach is still widely used.

With the advancement in the field of electrical resistivity tomography (ERT) from 1D to 2D and nowadays 3D, ERT has explored many fields. The applications of ERT include fault investigation, ground water table investigation, soil moisture content determination and many others. In industrial process imaging ERT can be used in a similar fashion to medical EIT, to image the distribution of conductivity in mixing vessels and pipes. In this context it is usually called electrical resistance tomography, emphasising the quantity that is measured rather than imaged.

== Operating procedure ==
Soil resistivity, measured in ohm-centimeters (Ω⋅cm), varies with moisture content and temperature changes. In general, an increase in soil moisture results in a reduction in soil resistivity. The pore fluid provides the only electrical path in sands, while both the pore fluid and the surface charged particles provide electrical paths in clays. Resistivities of wet fine-grained soils are generally much lower than those of wet coarse-grained soils. The difference in resistivity between a soil in a dry and in a saturated condition may be several orders of magnitude.

The method of measuring subsurface resistivity involves placing four electrodes in the ground in a line at equal spacing, applying a measured AC current to the outer two electrodes, and measuring the AC voltage between the inner two electrodes. A measured resistance is calculated by dividing the measured voltage by the measured current. This resistance is then multiplied by a geometric factor that includes the spacing between each electrode to determine the apparent resistivity.

Electrode spacings of 0.75, 1.5, 3.0, 6.0, and 12.0 m are typically used for shallow depths (<10 m) of investigations. Greater electrode spacings of 1.5, 3.0, 6.0, 15.0, 30.0, 100.0, and 150.0 m are typically used for deeper investigations. The depth of investigation is typically less than the maximum electrode spacing. Water is introduced to the electrode holes as the electrodes are driven into the ground to improve electrical contact.

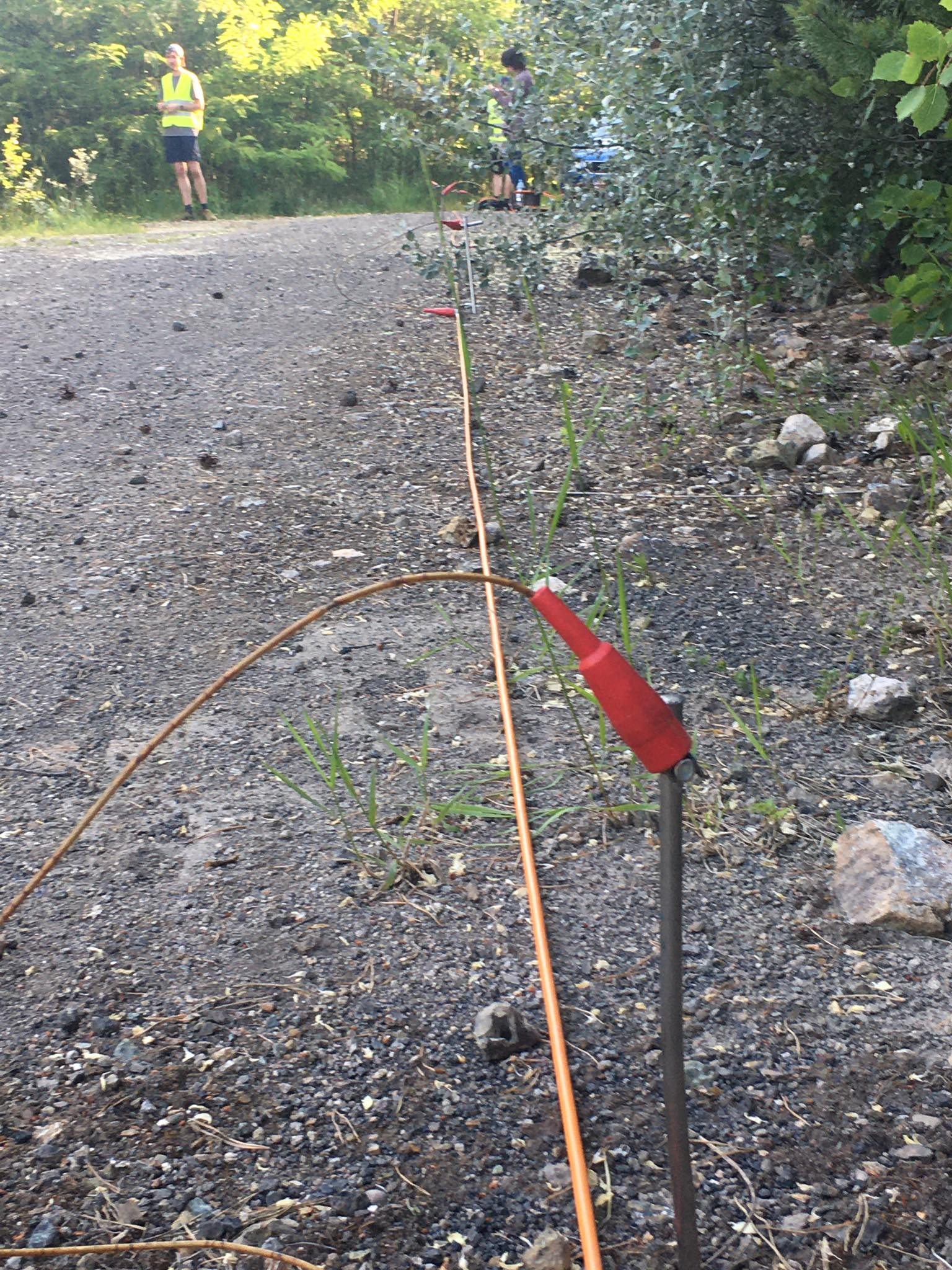
ERT survey

== Applications ==
ERT is used to create images of various subsurface conditions and structures. It has applications in numerous fields, including:

Environmental studies:

- Groundwater exploration: ERT helps locate underground aquifers and assess water quality.
- Contaminant mapping: ERT is used to monitor and delineate the spread of contaminants in soil and groundwater.
- Landfill monitoring: ERT monitors landfill conditions, gas generation and migration, and leachate pathways.

Geotechnical engineering:

- Site investigation: ERT is used to survey soil and rock properties and existing underground infrastructure in construction projects.
- Foundation assessment: ERT can evaluate the condition of foundations, detect voids, and assess load-bearing capacity.
- Sinkhole detection: ERT can identify subsurface voids that may lead to sinkholes.

Archaeology and cultural heritage:

- Buried archaeological features: ERT can detect buried structures, artefacts, and archaeological sites.
- Structural integrity of monuments: ERT helps assess the condition of historic buildings and structures.

Mining and mineral exploration:

- Mineral deposits: ERT can delineate the boundaries and characteristics of ore bodies.
- Cave detection: ERT is used to locate caves and karst features in mining areas.

Hydrogeology:

- Aquifer mapping: ERT is employed to create detailed maps of subsurface aquifers and their properties.
- Saltwater intrusion nonitoring: ERT helps detect and monitor the encroachment of saltwater into freshwater aquifers.

Engineering and infrastructure:

- Tunnel and dam assessment: ERT assesses the structural integrity of tunnels and dams.
- Pipeline and cable route surveys: It helps identify subsurface utilities and potential hazards.
- Landslide hazard assessment: ERT can detect subsurface slip planes and unstable slopes.
- Levee and embankment assessment: It assesses the structural integrity of levees and embankments.
- Building health inspections: ERT is used to examine the condition of foundations and other underground parts of buildings to guide upkeep and renovations.

Oil and gas exploration:

- Reservoir characterization: ERT assists in understanding subsurface reservoir properties.
- Monitoring fluid migration: ERT is used to track the movement of fluids in the subsurface during drilling and production.

Agriculture:

- Soil moisture mapping: ERT helps assess soil moisture content for precision agriculture.
- Root zone imaging: ERT is used to visualize plant root structures and soil-root interactions.

== See also ==
- Electrical capacitance tomography
- Electrical impedance tomography
- Three-dimensional electrical capacitance tomography
- Magnetotellurics
- Seismo-electromagnetics
- Telluric current
- Vertical electrical sounding
- Geophysical imaging
- Ground-penetrating radar
