= Magnetic induction tomography =

Imaging technique

Magnetic induction tomography (MIT) is an imaging technique used to image electromagnetic properties of an object by using the eddy current effect. It is also called electromagnetic induction tomography, electromagnetic tomography (EMT), eddy current tomography, and eddy current testing.

== Applications ==
The method is used in nondestructive testing and geophysics, and has potential applications in medicine. It is also used to generate 3D images of passive electromagnetic properties, which has applications in brain imaging, cryosurgery monitoring in medical imaging, and metal flow visualization in metalworking processes. Recently, eddy current sensors has been used to scan additive manufacturing for metal process layer-by-layer, producing eddy current tomography images. The company AMiquam has been developing this technology since 2020.
