= Electrical impedance tomography =

Noninvasive type of medical imaging

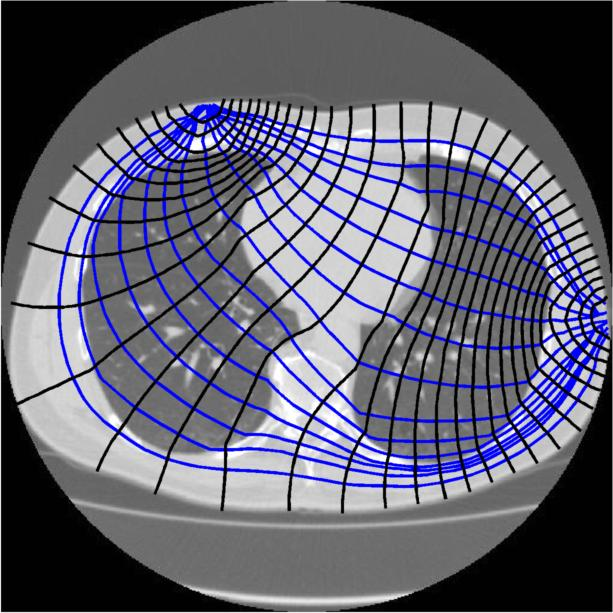
- A cross section of a human thorax from an X-ray CT showing current stream lines and equipotentials from drive electrodes. Note how lines are bent by the change in conductivity between different organs.
- Purpose: Measurements are used to form a tomographic image of a human body part

Electrical impedance tomography (EIT) is a noninvasive type of medical imaging in which the electrical conductivity, permittivity, and impedance of a part of the body is inferred from surface electrode measurements and used to form a tomographic image of that part. Electrical conductivity varies considerably among various types of biological tissues or due to the movement of fluids and gases within tissues. The majority of EIT systems apply small alternating currents at a single frequency; however, some EIT systems use multiple frequencies to better differentiate between normal and suspected abnormal tissue within the same organ.

Typically, conducting surface electrodes are attached to the skin around the body part being examined. Small alternating currents are applied to some or all of the electrodes, the resulting equipotentials being recorded from the other electrodes. This process will then be repeated for numerous different electrode configurations and finally result in a two-dimensional tomogram according to the image reconstruction algorithms used.

Since free-ion content determines tissue and fluid conductivity, muscle and blood will conduct applied currents better than fat, bone, or lung tissue. This property can be used to construct images. However, in contrast to linear x-rays used in computed tomography, electric currents travel three dimensionally along all the paths simultaneously, weighted by their conductivity (thus primarily along the path of highest conductivity, but not exclusively). Image construction can be difficult because there is usually more than one solution for a three-dimensional area projected onto a two-dimensional plane.

Mathematically, the problem of recovering conductivity from surface measurements of current and potential is a non-linear inverse problem and is severely ill-posed. The mathematical formulation of the problem was posed by Alberto Calderón, and in the mathematical literature of inverse problems it is often referred to as "Calderón's inverse problem" or the "Calderón problem". There is extensive mathematical research on the uniqueness of solutions and numerical algorithms for this problem.

Compared to the conductivities of most other soft tissues within the human thorax, lung tissue conductivity is approximately five-fold lower, resulting in high absolute contrast. This characteristic may partially explain the amount of research conducted in EIT lung imaging. Furthermore, lung conductivity fluctuates during the breath cycle which accounts for the interest of the research community to use EIT as a bedside method to visualize inhomogeneity of lung ventilation in mechanically ventilated patients. EIT measurements between two or more physiological states, e.g., between inspiration and expiration, are therefore referred to as time difference EIT (td-EIT).

td-EIT has one major advantage over absolute EIT (a-EIT): inaccuracies resulting from interindividual anatomy, insufficient skin contact of surface electrodes or impedance transfer can be dismissed because most artifacts will eliminate themselves due to simple image subtraction in td-EIT.

Further EIT applications proposed include detection/location of cancer in skin, breast, or cervix, localization of epileptic foci, imaging of brain activity. as well as a diagnostic tool for impaired gastric emptying. Attempts to detect or localize tissue pathology within normal tissue usually rely on multifrequency EIT (MF-EIT), also termed electrical impedance spectroscopy (EIS) and are based on differences in conductance patterns at varying frequencies.

== History ==
The invention of EIT as a medical imaging technique is usually attributed to John G. Webster and a publication in 1978, although the first practical realization of a medical EIT system was detailed in the 1984 work of David C. Barber and Brian H. Brown. Together, Brown and Barber published the first Electrical Impedance Tomogram in 1983, visualizing the cross section of a human forearm by absolute EIT. Even though there has been substantial progress since this, most a-EIT applications are still considered experimental, though there are commercial systems available.

Electrical resistivity tomography, a technique similar to EIT is used in geophysics and industrial process monitoring. In analogy to EIT, surface electrodes are being placed on the earth, within bore holes, or within a vessel or pipe in order to locate resistivity anomalies or monitor mixtures of conductive fluids. Setup and reconstruction techniques are comparable to EIT. In geophysics, the idea dates from the 1930s. Electrical resistivity tomography has also been proposed for mapping the electrical properties of substrates and thin films for electronic applications.

== Theory ==
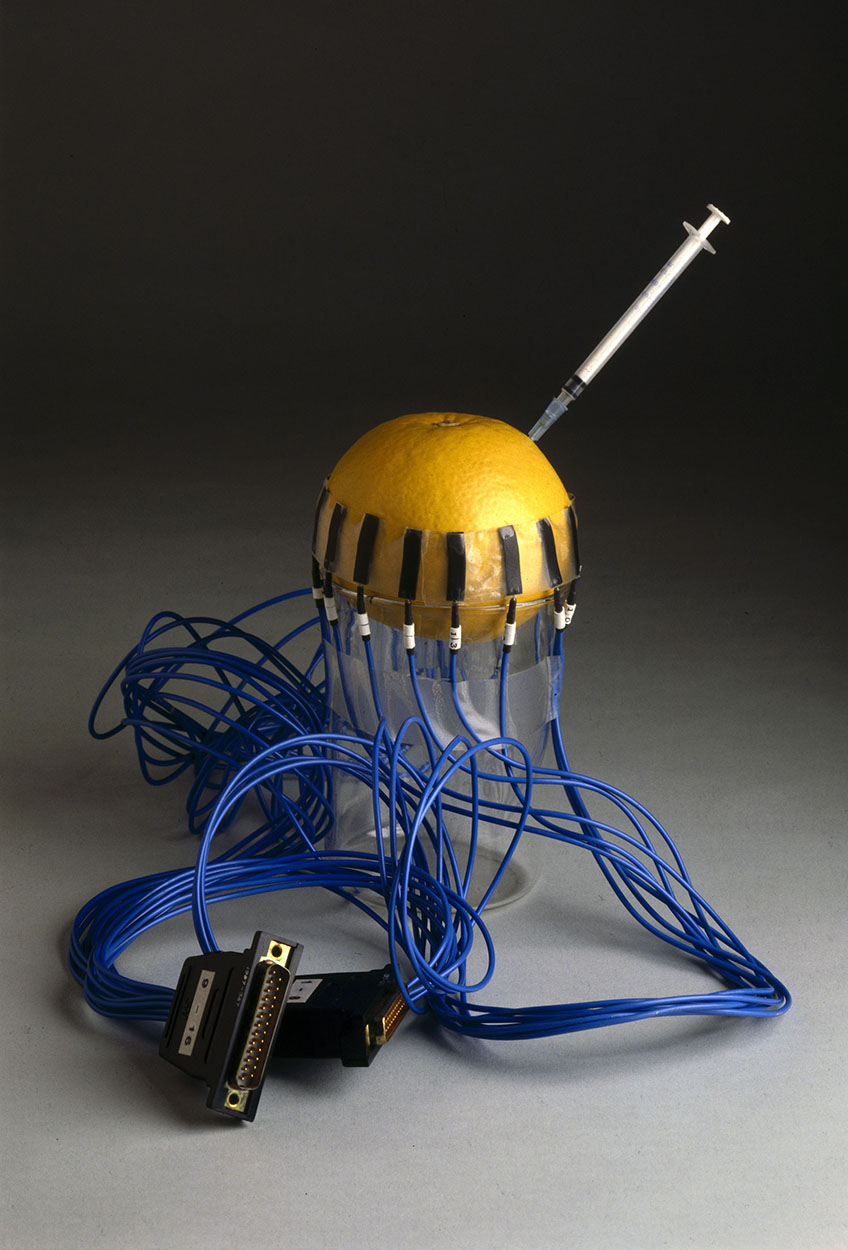
In this prototype, the electrodes are attached around a grapefruit which represents a child's head. Liquid is injected into the grapefruit to mimic brain haemorrhage.

Electrical conductivity and permittivity vary among biological tissue types and depend on their free ion content. Further factors affecting conductivity include temperature and other physiological factors, e.g., the respiratory cycle between in- and expiration when lung tissue becomes more conductive due to lower content of insulating air within its alveoli.

After positioning adhesive surface electrodes, an electrode belt or a conductive electrode vest around the body part of interest, alternating currents of typically a few milliamperes at a frequency of 10–100 kHz will be applied across two or more electrodes. The remaining electrodes will be used to measure the resulting voltage. The procedure will then be repeated for numerous stimulation patterns, i.e., successive pairs of adjacent electrodes, until an entire circle has been completed and image reconstruction can be carried out and displayed by a digital workstation. Image reconstruction incorporates complex mathematical algorithms and a priori data.

The current itself is applied using either a single current source switched between electrodes using a multiplexer or a system of voltage-to-current converters, one for each electrode, each controlled by a digital-to-analog converter. The measurements may be taken either by a single voltage measurement circuit multiplexed over the electrodes or a separate circuit for each electrode. Earlier EIT systems used an analog demodulation circuit to convert the alternating voltage to a direct current level before running it through an analog-to-digital converter. Newer systems convert the alternating signal directly to digital before performing digital demodulation. Some EIT systems are capable of working at multiple frequencies and measuring both magnitude and phase of the electrode voltages. Voltages measured are passed on to a computer to perform image reconstruction and display. The choice of current (or voltage) patterns affects the signal-to-noise ratio significantly. With devices capable of feeding currents from all electrodes simultaneously (such as ACT3) it is possible to adaptively determine optimal current patterns.

The achievable frame rate is set by the time needed to collect a complete set of boundary measurements. Where the excitation is routed sequentially between electrode pairs, an approach known as time-division multiplexing, fast 16-electrode instruments are typically limited to a few hundred frames per second. An alternative, first proposed for biomedical EIT, is to drive several excitations simultaneously, each at a distinct frequency, and to separate the superimposed responses by Fourier analysis, a scheme known as frequency-division multiplexing. Because the excitation is then continuous rather than switched, the transients arising from electrode–electrolyte contact impedance are suppressed, removing the dead time otherwise needed for the signal to settle. An implementation of this principle on a field-programmable gate array has been reported to image a 16-electrode sensor at up to 3,906 frames per second, with a signal-to-noise ratio of 55.6–69.1 dB across the 3.9–468.7 kHz band. Frame rates in this range are chiefly of interest in industrial process tomography, where multiphase flow structures evolve far faster than the physiological signals targeted in medical EIT.

If images are to be displayed in real time, a typical approach is the application of some form of regularized inverse of a linearization of the forward problem or a fast version of a direct reconstruction method such as the D-bar method. Most practical systems used in the medical environment generate a difference image, i.e. differences in voltage between two time points are left-multiplied by the regularized inverse to calculate an approximate difference between permittivity and conductivity images. Another approach is to construct a finite element model of the body and adjust the conductivities (for example, using a variant of Levenberg–Marquardt algorithm) to fit the measured data. This is more challenging as it requires accurate knowledge of body shape and the position of the electrodes.

Much of the fundamental work underpinning Electrical Impedance was done at Rensselaer Polytechnic Institute starting in the 1980s.

Absolute EIT approaches are targeted at digital reconstruction of static images, i.e., two-dimensional representations of the anatomy within the body part of interest. As mentioned above and unlike linear x-rays in computed tomography, electric currents travel three-dimensionally along the path of least resistivity, which results in partial loss of the electric current applied (impedance transfer, e.g., due to blood flow through the transverse plane). This is one of the reasons why image reconstruction in absolute EIT is so complex, since there is usually more than just one solution for image reconstruction of a three-dimensional area projected onto a two-dimensional plane. Another difficulty is that, given the number of electrodes and the measurement precision at each electrode, only objects bigger than a defined size can be distinguished.

Further difficulties in absolute EIT arise from inter- and intra-individual differences of electrode conductivity with associated image distortion and artifacts. It is also important to bear in mind that the body part of interest is rarely precisely rotund and that inter-individual anatomy varies, e.g., thorax shape, affecting individual electrode spacing. A prior data accounting for age-, height- and gender-typical anatomy can reduce sensitivity to artifacts and image distortion. Improving the signal-to-noise ratio, e.g., by using active surface electrodes, further reduces imaging errors. Some of the latest EIT systems with active electrodes monitor the performance of electrodes through an extra channel and are able to compensate for insufficient skin contact by removing them from the measurements. Another potential solution to the problem with electrode-skin contact is the contactless EIT technique, which uses voltage excitation and capacitive coupling instead of direct contact with the skin. Capacitively coupled electrodes are more comfortable for the patient but maintaining a constant and equal coupling capacitance for all electrodes is difficult.

Time difference EIT bypasses most of these issues by recording measurements in the same individual between two or more physiological states associated with linear conductivity changes. One of the best examples for this approach is lung tissue during breathing due to linear conductivity changes between inspiration and expiration, which are caused by varying contents of insulating air during each breath cycle. This permits digital subtraction of recorded measurements obtained during the breath cycle and results in functional images of lung ventilation. One major advantage is that relative changes of conductivity remain comparable between measurements even if one of the recording electrodes is less conductive than the others, thereby reducing most artifacts and image distortions. However, incorporating a priori data sets or meshes in difference EIT is still useful in order to project images onto the most likely organ morphology, which depends on weight, height, gender, and other individual factors.

== Projects ==
The open source project EIDORS provides a suite of programs (written in Matlab and GNU Octave) for data reconstruction and display under the GNU GPL license.

A matlab implementation of the direct nonlinear D-bar method for nonlinear EIT reconstruction is available.

The Open Innovation EIT Research Initiative is aimed at advancing the development of electrical impedance tomography (EIT) in general and to ultimately accelerate its clinical adoption.

A plug-and-play EIT hardware and software package was available through Swisstom until 2018.

Single‑Ended Electrical Impedance Tomography (SEEIT) developed by scientist Abdalla Salama, uses only one wire for each signal injection and one wire for each measurement. This design reduces wiring by 50%, simplifies the circuit, increases reliability, and eliminates the need for a current‑sinking source required in traditional EIT systems. SEEIT supports all major measurement strategies while reducing error and improving flexibility. Because small measurement inaccuracies can lead to significant reconstruction errors, SEEIT contributes to the development of high‑precision EIT systems.

== Properties ==
In contrast to other tomographic imaging techniques, EIT does not apply any kind of ionizing radiation. Currents typically applied in EIT are relatively small and certainly below the threshold at which they would cause significant nerve stimulation. The frequency of the alternating current is sufficiently high not to give rise to electrolytic effects in the body and the Ohmic heating is sufficiently small and diffused over the body to be easily handled by the body's thermoregulatory system. These properties qualify EIT to be continuously applied in humans. And because the equipment needed in order to perform EIT is much smaller and less costly than in conventional tomography, EIT qualifies for continuous real-time visualization of mechanical ventilation.

EIT's major disadvantage versus conventional tomography is its lower maximum spatial resolution (approximately 15% of electrode array diameter in EIT compared to 1 mm in CT and MRI). However, resolution can be improved using 32 instead of 16 electrodes. Image quality can be further improved by constructing an EIT system with active surface electrodes, which significantly reduce signal loss, artifacts, and interferences associated with cables as well as cable length and handling. In contrast to spatial resolution, temporal resolution of EIT (0.1 milliseconds) is much higher than in CT or MRI (0.1 seconds).

== Applications ==
=== Lung ===
EIT is particularly useful for monitoring lung function because lung tissue resistivity is five times higher than most other soft tissues in the thorax. This results in high absolute contrast of the lungs. In addition, lung resistivity increases and decreases several-fold between inspiration and expiration, which explains why monitoring ventilation is currently the most promising clinical application of EIT since mechanical ventilation frequently results in ventilator-associated lung injury (VALI). The feasibility of EIT for lung imaging was first demonstrated at Rensselaer Polytechnic Institute in 1990 using the NOSER algorithm. Time difference EIT can resolve the changes in the distribution of lung volumes between dependent and non-dependent lung regions and assist in adjusting ventilator settings to provide lung protective ventilation to patients during critical illness or anesthesia.

Most EIT studies have focused on monitoring regional lung function using time difference EIT (td-EIT). However absolute EIT (a-EIT) also has the potential to become a clinically useful tool for lung imaging, as this approach would allow one to directly distinguish between lung conditions which result from regions with lower resistivity (e.g., hemothorax, pleural effusion, atelectasis, lung edema) and those with higher resistivity (e.g., pneumothorax, emphysema).

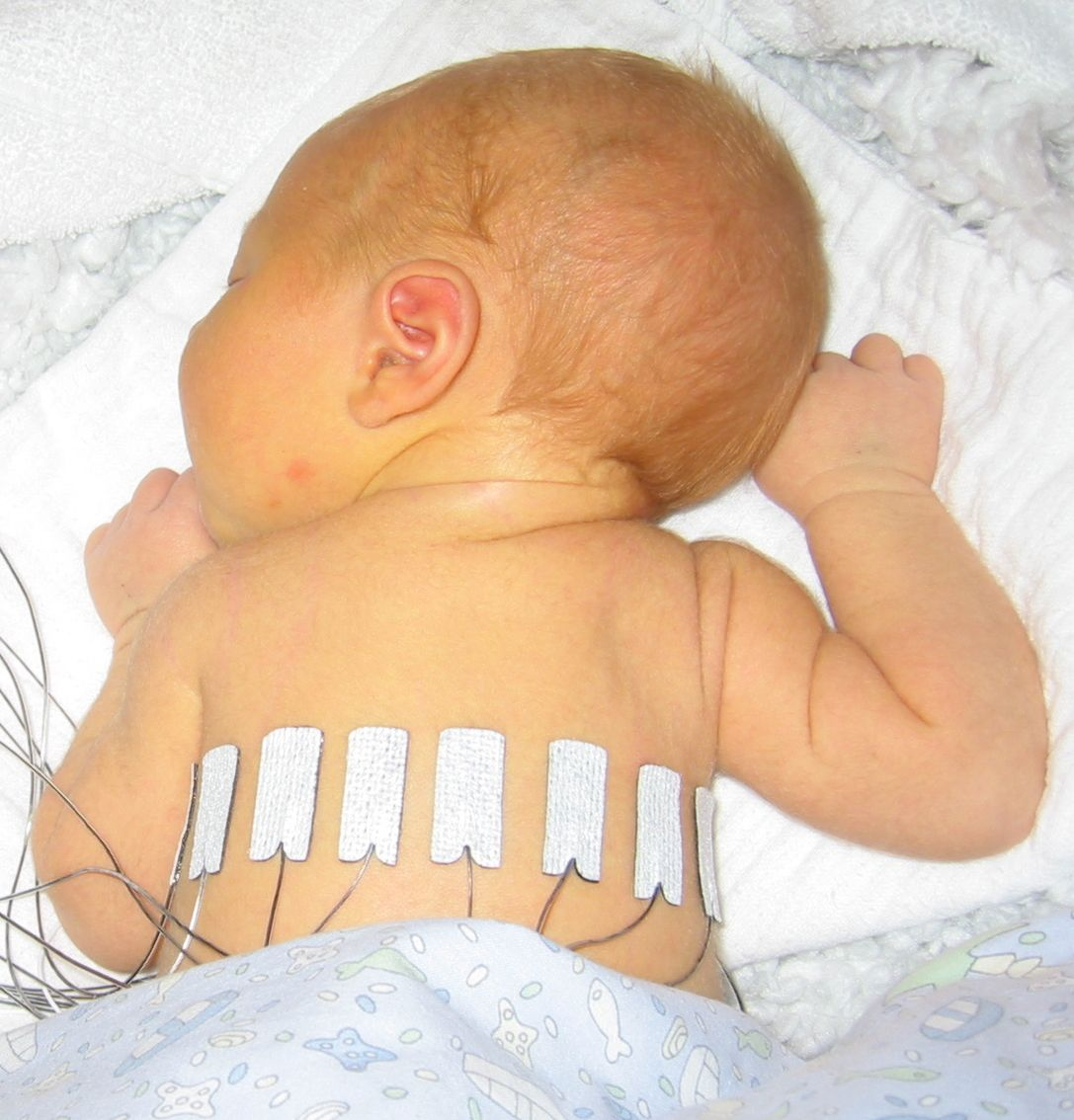
Adhesive electrodes on chest of a 10-day-old baby

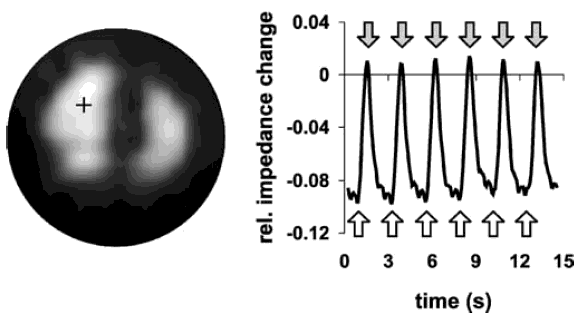
EIT reconstruction (left) and impedance change over six breaths, from. Data available on.

The above image shows an EIT study of a 10-day-old baby breathing normally with 16 adhesive electrodes applied to the chest.

Image reconstruction from absolute impedance measurements requires consideration of the exact dimensions and shape of a body as well as the precise electrode location since simplified assumptions would lead to major reconstruction artifacts. While initial studies assessing aspects of absolute EIT have been published, this area of research has not yet reached the level of maturity which would make it suitable for clinical use.

In contrast, time difference EIT determines relative impedance changes that may be caused by either ventilation or changes of end-expiratory lung volume. These relative changes are referred to a baseline level, which is typically defined by the intra-thoracic impedance distribution at the end of expiration.

Time difference EIT images can be generated continuously at the bedside. These attributes make regional lung function monitoring particularly useful whenever there is a need to improve oxygenation or CO_{2} elimination and when therapy changes are intended to achieve a more homogeneous gas distribution in mechanically ventilated patients. EIT lung imaging can resolve the changes in the regional distribution of lung volumes between, e.g., dependent and non-dependent lung regions as ventilator parameters are changed. Thus, EIT measurements may be used to guide specific ventilator settings to maintain lung protective ventilation for each patient.

Besides the applicability of EIT in the ICU, first studies with spontaneously breathing patients reveal further promising applications. The high temporal resolution of EIT allows regional assessment of common dynamic parameters used in pulmonary function testing (e.g., forced expiratory volume in one second). Additionally, specially developed image fusion methods overlaying functional EIT data with morphological patient data (e.g., CT or MRI images) may be used to get a comprehensive insight into the pathophysiology of the lungs, which might be useful for patients with obstructive lung diseases (e.g., COPD or CF).

After many years of lung EIT research with provisional EIT equipment or models manufactured in very small numbers, commercial systems for lung EIT have entered in the medical technology market and have been installed in intensive care units and are used as aides in decision-making processes related to the treatment of patients with acute respiratory distress syndrome (ARDS). The increasing availability of commercial EIT systems in ICUs will show whether the promising body of evidence obtained from animal models will apply to humans as well (EIT-guided lung recruitment, selection of optimum PEEP levels, pneumothorax detection, prevention of ventilator-associated lung injury (VALI), etc.). This would be highly desirable, given that recent studies suggest that 15% of mechanically ventilated patients in the ICU will develop acute lung injury (ALI) with attendant progressive lung collapse and which is associated with a reportedly high mortality of 39%.

In addition to visual information (e.g., regional distribution of tidal volume), EIT measurements provide raw data sets that can be used to calculate other helpful information (e.g., changes in intrathoracic gas volume during critical illness) – however, such parameters still require careful evaluation and validation.

Another interesting aspect of thoracic EIT is its ability to record and filter pulsatile signals of perfusion. Although promising studies have been published on this topic. A breakthrough would allow simultaneous visualization of both regional blood flow and regional ventilation – enabling clinicians to locate and react to physiological shunts caused by regional mismatches of lung ventilation and perfusion with associated hypoxemia.

=== Breast (MF-EIT) ===
EIT is being investigated in the field of breast imaging as an alternative or complementary technique to mammography and magnetic resonance imaging (MRI) for breast cancer detection. The low specificity of mammography and MRI result in a relatively high rate of false positive screenings, with high distress for patients and additional cost for healthcare. Development of alternative imaging techniques for this indication would be desirable due to other shortcomings of the existing methods: ionizing radiation in mammography and the risk of inducing nephrogenic systemic fibrosis (NSF) in patients with decreased renal function by administering the contrast agent used in breast MRI, Gadolinium.

Literature shows that the electrical properties differ between normal and malignant breast tissues, setting the stage for cancer detection through determination of electrical properties.

An early commercial development of non-tomographic electrical impedance imaging was the T-Scan device which was reported to improve sensitivity and specificity when used as an adjunct to screening mammography. A report to the United States Food and Drug Administration (FDA) describes a study involving 504 subjects where the sensitivity of mammography was 82%, 62% for the T-Scan alone, and 88% for the two combined. The specificity was 39% for mammography, 47% for the T-Scan alone, and 51% for the two combined.

Several research groups across the world are actively developing the technique. A frequency sweep seems to be an effective technique for detecting breast cancer using EIT.

United States Patent US 8,200,309 B2 combines electrical impedance scanning with magnetic resonance low frequency current density imaging in a clinically acceptable configuration not requiring the use of gadolinium chelate enhancement in magnetic resonance mammography.

=== Cervix (MF-EIT) ===
In addition to his pioneering role in the development of the first EIT systems in Sheffield professor Brian H. Brown is currently active in the research and development of an electrical impedance spectroscope based on MF-EIT. According to a study published by Brown in 2000, MF-EIT is able to predict [Cervical intraepithelial neoplasia] (CIN) grades 2 and 3 according to Pap smear with a sensitivity and specificity of 92% each. Whether cervical MF-EIT is going to be introduced as an adjunct or an alternative to the Pap smear has yet to be decided. Brown is academic founder of Zilico Limited which distributes the spectroscope (ZedScan I). The device received EC certification from its Notified Body in 2013 and is currently being introduced into a number of clinics in the UK and healthcare systems across the globe.

=== Brain (a-EIT, td-EIT, mf-EIT) ===
EIT has been suggested as a basis for brain imaging to enable detection and monitoring of cerebral ischemia, haemorrhage, and other morphological pathologies associated with impedance changes due to neuronal cell swelling, i.e. cerebral hypoxemia and hypoglycemia.

While EIT's maximum spatial resolution of approximately 15% of the electrode array diameter is significantly lower than that of cerebral CT or MRI (about one millimeter), temporal resolution of EIT is much higher than in CT or MRI (0.1 milliseconds compared to 0.1 seconds). This makes EIT also interesting for monitoring normal brain function and neuronal activity in intensive care units or the preoperative setting for localization of epileptic foci by telemetric recordings.

Holder was able to demonstrate in 1992 that changes of intracerebral impedance can be detected noninvasively through the cranium by surface electrode measurements. Animal models of experimental stroke or seizure showed increases of impedance of up to 100% and 10%, respectively. More recent EIT systems offer the option to apply alternating currents from non-adjacent drive electrodes. So far, cerebral EIT has not yet reached the maturity to be adopted in clinical routine, yet clinical studies are currently being performed on stroke and epilepsy.

In this use EIT depends upon applying low frequency currents above the skull that are around <100 Hz since during neuronal rest at this frequency these currents remain in the extracellular space and therefore unable to enter the intracellular space within neurons. However, when a neuron generates an action potential or is about to be depolarized, resistance of its membrane preventing this will be reduced by eighty-fold. Whenever this happens in a larger numbers of neurons, resistivity changes of about 0.06–1.7 % will result. These changes in resistivity provide a means of detecting coherent neuronal activity across larger numbers of neurons and so the tomographic imaging of neural brain activity.

Unfortunately while such changes are detectable "they are just too small to support reliable production of images." The prospects of using this technique for this indication will depend upon improved signal processing or recording.

A study reported in June 2011 that Functional Electrical Impedance Tomography by Evoke Response (fEITER) has been used to image changes in brain activity after injection of an anaesthetic. One of the benefits of the technique is that the equipment required is small enough and easy enough to transport so that it can be used for monitoring depth of anesthesia in operating theatres.

=== Perfusion (td-EIT) ===
Due to its relatively high conductivity, blood may be used for functional imaging of perfusion in tissues and organs characterized by lower conductivities, e.g. to visualize regional lung perfusion. Background of this approach is that pulsatile tissue impedance changes according to differences in the filling of blood vessels between systole and diastole, particularly when injecting saline as contrasting agent.

=== Sports medicine / home care (a-EIT, td-EIT) ===
Electrical impedance measurements may also be used to calculate abstract parameters, i.e. nonvisual information. Recent advances in EIT technology as well as the lower number of electrodes required for recording global instead of regional parameters in healthy individuals can be used for non-invasive determination of e.g. VO_{2} or arterial blood pressure in sports medicine or home care.

== Commercial systems ==
=== a-EIT and td-EIT ===
Even though medical EIT systems had not been used broadly until recently, several medical equipment manufacturers have been supplying commercial versions of lung imaging systems developed by university research groups. One of the first systems is produced by Maltron International who distribute the Sheffield Mark 3.5 system with 16 electrodes. Similar systems are the Goe MF II system developed by the University of Göttingen, (Germany) and distributed through CareFusion (16 electrodes), the Sentec LuMon System (32 electrodes – adult and neonate/infant belts), and the Enlight 1800 developed at the University of São Paulo School of Medicine and the Polytechnic Institute of the University of São Paulo which is distributed by Timpel SA (Adult Belt Reusable - 32 electrodes; Pediatric Belt Reusable - 24 electrodes; Neonatal Belt Disposable - 16 electrodes). Sentec and Timpel are both FDA-cleared electrical impedance tomography devices. Sentec's LuMon System is FDA-cleared for spontaneously breathing patients, and is available with belt sizes for preterm infants. These systems typically comply with medical safety legislation and have been primarily employed by clinical research groups in hospitals, most of them in critical care.

The first EIT device for lung function monitoring designed for everyday clinical use in the critical care environment has been made available by Dräger Medical in 2011 – the PulmoVista® 500 (16-electrode system).

=== Sentec LuMon ===
Sentec's involvement in EIT began with its 2018 acquisition of Swisstom and subsequent development of the LuMon EIT system. Non-adhesive fabric belts with integrated position-tracking sensors contain 32 electrodes that deliver alternating currents through the thorax and measure resulting voltages. The measurements are transformed into regional images and parameters, helping clinicians to assess changes in lung recruitment, personalize ventilator strategies, and intervene proactively.

LuMon has been utilized in various research projects in neonatal and adult critical care internationally, including the EU-funded multi-center CRADL project, demonstrating safety and feasibility in more than 200 premature infants for durations up to 72 hours.

=== Timpel Medical ===
New strategies in artificial ventilation began to be developed through a research project, led by Marcelo Amato MD, PhD, University of São Paulo pulmonologist, between 2002 and 2008. These new ventilation strategies drove the need for innovation that would allow real-time visualization of ventilation and the individualization of treatment at the bedside. With this objective in mind, Timpel was created in 2004. In the same year, Dr Amato and his Team published the article "Imbalances in Regional Lung Ventilation: A Validation Study on Electrical Impedance Tomography" in the renowned ATS Journal, the American Journal of Respiratory and Critical Care Medicine otherwise known as the Blue Journal. This was just the beginning of the journey. Amato's research Team published more than 30 articles about EIT from 2004 to 2023. This research has contributed to the many tools available with EIT today. Because of the tremendous interest in EIT and the value the technology brings to the bedside, researchers around the world have contributed to the body of evidence with more than 250 peer reviewed publications in press by 2022. Timpel's name is derived from the technology (Electric Impedance Tomography) written in reverse. El – electrical; Imp – impedance; T-tomography. Timpel is passionate and motivated: to make EIT a valuable adjunctive tool for lung protective strategies contributing to the next generation methodology of treating critically ill patients at the bedside. With Timpel's ENLIGHT, electrical impedance tomography device each patient's care is individualized based on their lung disease. ENLIGHT gives the Clinicians visibility of the ventilation disease profile in real time, at the bedside without the added risk of transportation.

=== MF-EIT ===
Multifrequency-EIT (MF-EIT) or electrical impedance spectroscopy (EIS) systems are typically designed to detect or locate abnormal tissue, e.g. precancerous lesions or cancer. Impedance Medical Technologies manufacture systems based on designs by the Research Institute of Radioengineering and Electronics of the Russian Academy of Science in Moscow, that are aimed especially at breast cancer detection. Texas-based Mirabel Medical Systems, Inc. develops a similar solution for non-invasive detection of breast cancer and offers the T-Scan 2000ED. Zilico Limited distributes an electrical impedance spectroscope named ZedScan I as a medical device supposed to aid cervical intraepithelial neoplasia location/diagnosis. The device just received EC certification in 2013.

=== V5R ===
The v5r is a high-performance device, based upon a voltage-voltage measurement technique, designed to improve process control. The high frame rate of the v5r (over 650 frames per second) means that it can be used to monitor rapidly evolving processes or dynamic flow conditions. The data it provides can be used to determine the flow profile of complex multiphase processes; allowing engineers to discriminate between laminar flow, plug flow and other important flow conditions for deeper understanding and improved process control.

When used for concentration measurements, the ability to measure full impedance across a wide range of phase ratios means the v5r is able to deliver considerable accuracy across a wider conductivity range compared to other devices.

== See also ==
- Boundary estimation in EIT
- EIDORS a reconstruction toolbox for EIT
- Electrical capacitance tomography
- Industrial Tomography Systems
- Respiratory monitoring
- Three-dimensional electrical capacitance tomography
