= Electrical capacitance tomography =

ECT image sequence - An object made of acrylic glass, rotating inside a probe.

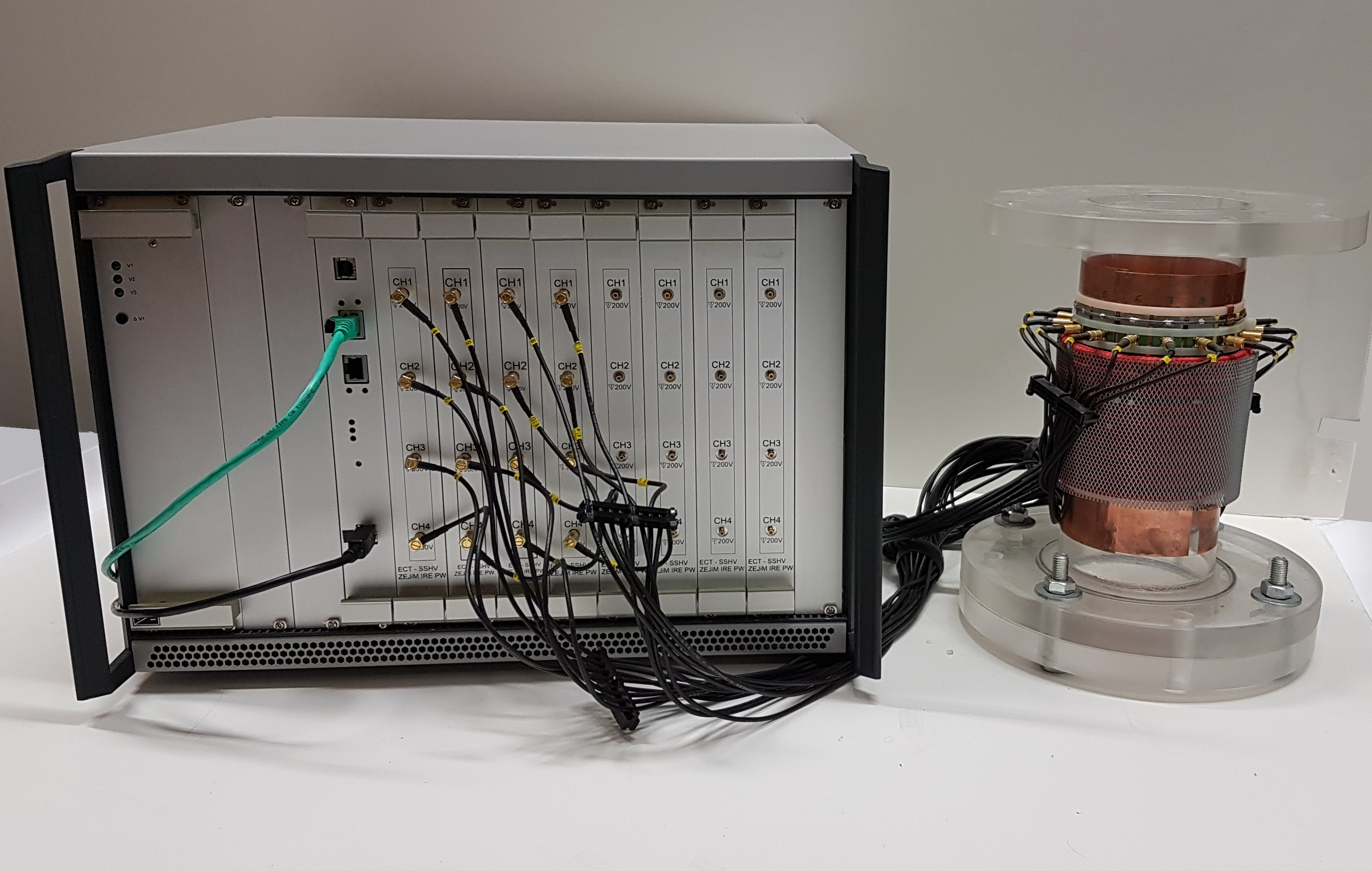
Electrical capacitance tomography system with connected 16-electrode sensor

Dynamic imaging in ECT - On the left, seven cylindrical objects moving along the probe. On the right, a series of probe cross-sectional images.

Electrical capacitance tomography (ECT) is a method for determination of the dielectric permittivity distribution in the interior of an object from external capacitance measurements. It is a close relative of electrical impedance tomography and is proposed as a method for industrial process monitoring.

Although capacitance sensing methods were in widespread use the idea of using capacitance measurement to form images is attributed to Maurice Beck and co-workers at UMIST in the 1980s.

Although usually called tomography, the technique differs from conventional tomographic methods, in which high resolution images are formed of slices of a material. The measurement electrodes, which are metallic plates, must be sufficiently large to give a measureable change in capacitance. This means that very few electrodes are used, typically eight to sixteen electrodes. An N-electrode system can only provide N(N−1)/2 independent measurements. This means that the technique is limited to producing very low resolution images of approximate slices. However, ECT is fast, and relatively inexpensive.

== Applications ==
Applications of ECT include the measurement of flow of fluids in pipes and measurement of the concentration of one fluid in another, or the distribution of a solid in a fluid. ECT enables the visualization of multiphase flow, which play an important role in the technological processes of the chemical, petrochemical and food industries. Due to its very low spatial resolution, ECT has not yet been used in medical diagnostics. Potentially, ECT may have similar medical applications to electrical impedance tomography, such as monitoring lung function or detecting ischemia or hemorrhage in the brain.

== See also ==
- Three-dimensional electrical capacitance tomography
- Electrical impedance tomography
- Electrical resistivity tomography
- Industrial Tomography Systems
- Process tomography
