= Geophysical imaging =

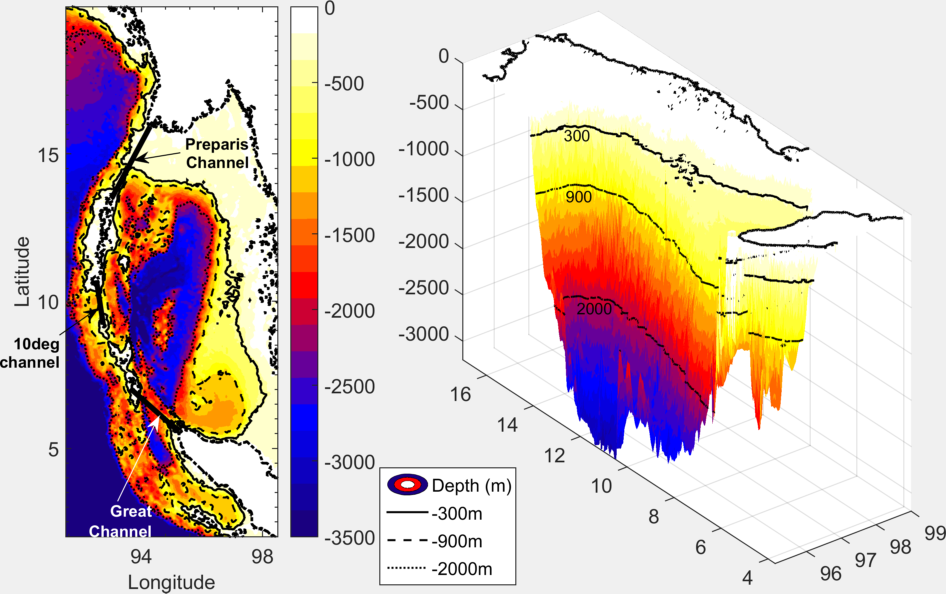
Example of a 2D and 3D model created using geophysical imaging techniques.

Geophysical imaging (also known as geophysical tomography) is a minimally destructive geophysical technique that investigates the subsurface of a terrestrial planet. Geophysical imaging is a noninvasive imaging technique with a high parametrical and spatio-temporal resolution. It can be used to model a surface or object understudy in 2D or 3D as well as monitor changes.

There are many applications of geophysical imaging some of which include imaging the lithosphere and imaging glaciers. Many different techniques exist to perform geophysical imaging including seismic methods, electrical resistivity tomography, ground-penetrating radar, etc.

Types of geophysical imaging:

- Electrical resistivity tomography
- Ground-penetrating radar
- Induced polarization
- Seismic tomography and Reflection seismology
- Magnetotellurics

== Applications ==
=== Imaging the Lithosphere ===
Some geophysical imaging techniques for the Earth's lithosphere and upper mantle include teleseismic tomography, surface-wave tomography, gravity modeling, and electromagnetic methods. Geophysical imaging techniques can be combined to create a more accurate image of the lithosphere. The techniques used to image the lithosphere can be used to map out the thermostructure of the Earth. In turn, the thermostructure reveals near surface processes such as seismicity, magma emplacement, and mineralization events. The ability to image the thermostructure could also reveal geophysical observables like gravity and information about tectonic plates like plate velocity and strain partitioning.

=== Alpine Rock Glaciers ===
Geophysical imaging techniques have been applied to alpine rock glaciers to better understand mountain permafrost and perform hazard-mitigation measures. The types of geophysical imaging used include: diffusive electromagnetic, geoelectric, seismic tomography, and ground-penetrating radar. In fact, the first use of ground-penetrating radar was to determine a glacier's depth in 1929. Two dimensional geophysical imaging techniques have recently allowed for 2D imaging of mountain permafrost.

== Types of geophysical imaging ==
=== Seismic Methods ===
Seismic methods utilize elastic energy created by natural and artificial sources to create an image of the subsurface. Seismic waves are recorded on geophones. Seismic methods are split up into three different methods, reflection, refraction, and surface wave, based on the physical property of the waves being considered. The reflection method looks at reflected energy from sharp boundaries to determine contrasts in density and velocity. Reflections methods are mainly applied in the upper subsurface; however, strong lateral and vertical seismic velocity variations cause reflection methods to be difficult to implement in the upper 50 meters of the subsurface. The refraction method looks at refracted compressional, p-waves, or shear, s-waves, that bend through velocity gradients. Tracking differences in velocity of the p-waves and s-waves can be useful because s-wave's velocity react differently to fluid saturation and fracture geometry. Reflection and refraction seismic methods exploit the waves that can be produced by sledgehammer, explosives, weight drops, and vibrators to image the subsurface. The third seismic method, surface wave methods, look at the surface waves that seem to roll along the surface (ground roll). Utilization of several different seismic methods can accomplish a more precise and clearer result of seismic imaging.

== See also ==
- Archaeological geophysics
- Electrical resistivity tomography
- Ground-penetrating radar
- Exploration geophysics
- Geophysical Tomography Group (The)
- Medical imaging
- Stanford Exploration Project
