= Spectral induced polarisation =

Spectral induced polarization (SIP), or complex resistivity (CR) and also complex conductivity (CC), is a geophysical survey technique and an extension of the induced polarization (IP) method, being itself an extension of measuring the Earth's resistance at a single frequency or under direct current (DC) (a technique commonly known by the name resistivity). SIP measures the frequency-dependent (i.e. spectral) complex impedance, equivalent to the amount of resistance and phase shift between electric current and voltage. The usual frequency range for alternating current (AC) applied during SIP surveys is tens of kHz to MHz. As with other geophysical methods, SIP aims to distinguish material properties of the subsurface, such as salinity and saturation.

== See also ==
- AC impedance spectroscopy
- Electrical resistivity measurement of concrete
