= Tissue clearing =

Tissue clearing refers to a group of chemical techniques used to turn tissues transparent. By turning tissues transparent to certain wavelengths of light, it allows one to gain optical access to a tissue. That is, light can pass into and out of the cleared tissue freely, allowing one to see the structures deep within the tissue without physically cutting it open. Many tissue clearing methods exist, each with different strengths and weaknesses. Some are generally applicable, while others are designed for specific applications. Tissue clearing is usually useful only combined with one or more fluorescent labeling techniques such as immunolabeling and subsequently imaged, most often by optical sectioning microscopy techniques. Tissue clearing has been applied to many areas in biological research. It is one of the more efficient ways to perform three-dimensional histology.

== History ==
In the early 1900s, Werner Spalteholz developed a technique that allowed the clarification of large tissues, using Wintergrünöl (methyl salicylate) and benzyl benzoate. Various scientists then introduced their own variations on Spalteholz's technique. Tuchin et al. introduced tissue optical clearing (TOC) in 1997, adding a new branch of tissue clearing that was hydrophilic instead of hydrophobic like Spalteholz's technique. In the 1980s, Andrew Murray & Marc Kirschner developed a two-step process, wherein tissues were first dehydrated with alcohol and subsequently made transparent by immersion in a mixture of benzyl alcohol and benzyl benzoate (BABB), a technique they coupled with light sheet fluorescence microscopy, which remains the method with the highest clearing efficacy to date, regardless any tissue pre-processing step. In the most extreme case, it allows the clearing of a whole mouse of even a whole human brain.

In 2024, Hong, Brongersma, and Ou reported that applying high concentrations of the food dye tartrazine could transiently and reversibly increase the optical transparency of certain biological tissues, including the skin, in live mice. The authors attributed this effect to tartrazine's strong absorption in the blue region of the visible spectrum and to refractive index modulation at longer wavelengths, consistent with the Kramers–Kronig relations. Following publication, the findings have been independently reproduced and extended by multiple laboratories in several subsequent studies. Specifically, this in vivo optical clearing approach has been applied by multiple independent laboratories to enhance imaging depth in modalities such as optical coherence tomography and photoacoustic imaging. In 2025, Valery V. Tuchin, a pioneer in hydrophilic tissue clearing, demonstrated tartrazine can make the skull more transparent in live mice, enabling transcranial laser speckle imaging of cortical blood flow in real time. In addition, a number of other labs have demonstrated the utility of tartrazine to enable deep-tissue Raman sensing and fluorescence lifetime imaging. In addition to tartrazine, several other absorbing dye molecules, including the FDA-approved contrast agents fluorescein and indocyanine green, have also been repurposed to function as in vivo optical clearing agents. This observation suggests that the underlying physical principle of dye-enabled optical clearing is not limited to a single molecule and that multiple dye molecules may be repurposed as tissue clearing agents.

== Principles ==
Tissue opacity is thought to be the result of light scattering due to heterogeneous refractive indices. Tissue clearing methods chemically homogenize refractive indices, resulting in almost completely transparent tissue.

== Classifications ==
While there are multiple class names for tissue-clearing methods, they are all classified based on the final state of the tissue by the end of the clearing method. These include hydrophobic clearing methods, which may also be known as organic, solvent-based, organic solvent-based, or dehydration clearing methods; hydrophilic clearing methods, which may also be known as aqueous-based or water-based methods, and hydrogel-based clearing methods.

== Labeling ==
Tissue clearing methods have varying compatibility with different methods of fluorescent labeling. Some are better suited to genetic labelling by endogenously expressed fluorescent protein, while others externally delivered probes as immunolabeling and chemical dye labeling. The latter is more general and applicable to all tissues, notably human tissues, but the penetration of the probes becomes a critical problem.

== Imaging ==
After clearing and labeling, tissues are typically imaged using confocal microscopy, two-photon microscopy, or one of the many variants of light-sheet fluorescence microscopy. Other less commonly used methods include optical projection tomography and stimulated Raman scattering. As long as the tissue allows for the unobstructed passing of light, the optical resolution is fundamentally limited by Abbe diffraction limit. The compatibility of any tissue clearing method with any microscopy system is, therefore, configurational rather than optical.

== Data ==
Tissue clearing is one of the more efficient ways to facilitate 3D imaging of tissues, and hence generates massive volumes of complex data, which requires powerful computational hardware and software to store, process, analyze, and visualize. A single mouse brain can generate terabytes of data. Both commercial and open-source software exists to address this need, some of it adapted from solutions for two-dimensional images and some of it designed specifically for the three-dimensional images produced by imaging of cleared tissues.

== Applications ==
Tissue clearing has been applied to the nervous system, bones (including teeth), skeletal muscles, hearts and vasculature, gastrointestinal organs, urogenital organs, skin, lymph nodes, mammary glands, lungs, eyes, tumors, and adipose tissues. Whole-body clearing is less common, but has been done in smaller animals, including rodents. Tissue clearing has also been applied to human cancer tissues. For some techniques, bone tissue must be decalcified to remove light-scattering hydroxyapatite crystals, leaving behind a protein matrix suitable for clearing.
