= Johann Heinrich Rille =

Johann Heinrich Rille (10 December 1864 in Brünn – 14 December 1956 in Höflein an der Donau) was an Austrian dermatologist and venereologist.

From 1883 to 1891 he studied archaeology, linguistics, anthropology and medicine at the universities of Vienna and Graz. From 1892 he served as an assistant to Isidor Neumann at Vienna, where in 1897 he obtained his habilitation for dermatology. In 1898 he became an associate professor at the University of Innsbruck, and four years later succeeded dermatologist Gustav Riehl at the University of Leipzig. In 1904 he became an honorary professor of dermatology at Leipzig, followed by a full professorship in 1919. In 1921/22 he served as dean to the medical faculty. In 1940 he became a member of the Deutsche Akademie der Naturforscher Leopoldina.

In 1922 he was the first to describe the distinctive features of a condition later known as ichthyosis linearis circumflexa ("Rille-Comél disease"). With Paul Gerson Unna, he was editor of the journals Dermatologische Wochenschrift and Dermatologischen Studien.

== Selected works ==
- Lehrbuch der Haut- und Geschlechtskrankeinheiten – Textbook of skin and sexual diseases.
- Creeping disease (with Rudolf Erhard Riecke) In: Handbuch der Hautkrankheiten, volume 4, 2, 1909 – Creeping disease.
- Die Schädigungen der Haut durch Beruf und gewerbliche Arbeit, (with Karl Ullmann; Moriz Oppenheim; 3 volumes, 1922–26) – Damage of the skin caused by professional and commercial work.
