= Sillars (surname) =

Sillars is a surname. Notable people with the surname include:

- Donald Sillars (1868–1905), Scottish footballer
- Jim Sillars (born 1937), Scottish politician
- Agnes Sillars Hamilton (c.1794–1870, née Sillars), Scottish reformer, lecturer and phrenologist

== Other uses ==
- Maxwell–Wagner–Sillars polarization
