= Vertical electrical sounding =

Vertical electrical sounding (VES) is a geophysical method for investigation of a geological medium. The method is based on the estimation of the electrical conductivity or resistivity of the medium. The estimation is performed based on the measurement of voltage of electrical field induced by the distant grounded electrodes (current electrodes).

== Measurements ==
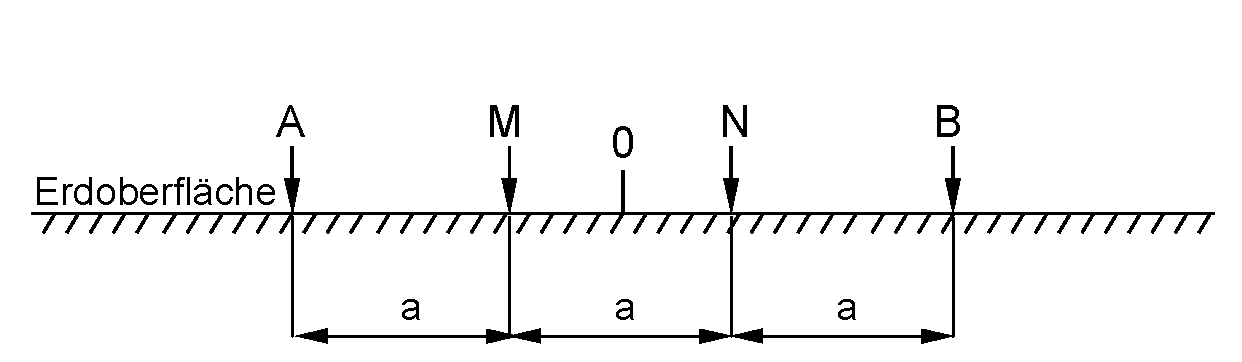
Figure 1. Electrical profiling using four-electrode probes in Wenner configuration.

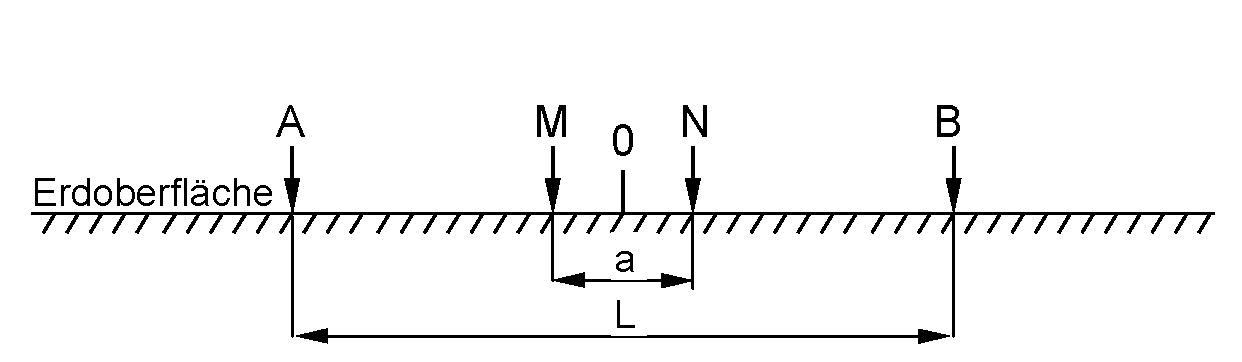
Figure 2. Electrical profiling using four-electrode probes in Schlumberger configuration.

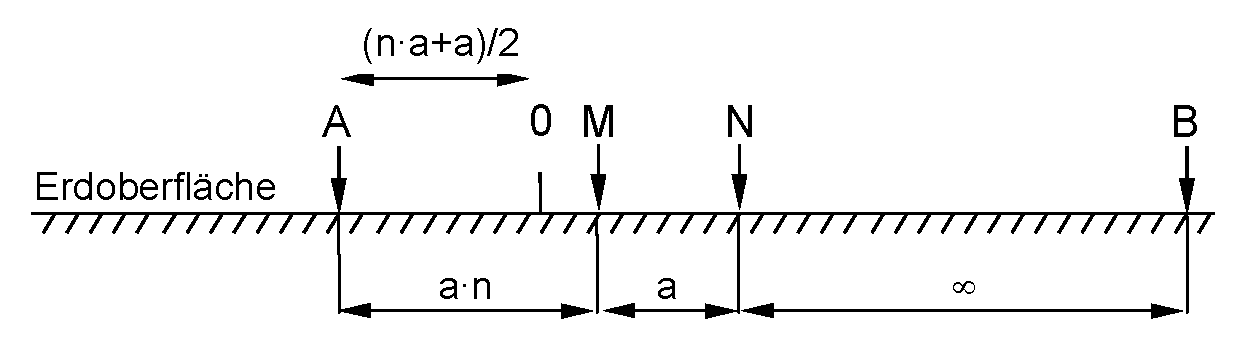
Figure 3. Pole–dipole array profiling.

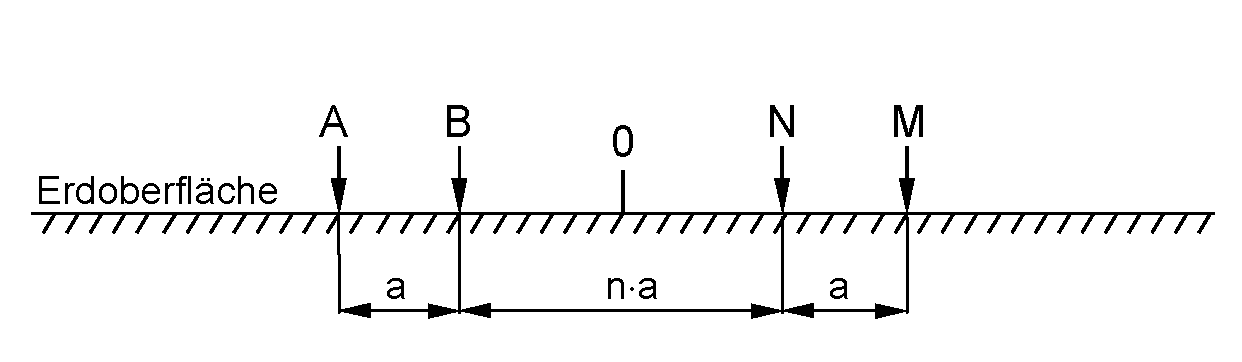
Figure 4. Dipole–dipole electrode array profiling.

Figures 1–4 show the possible configuration of the measurement setup. The electrodes A and B are current electrodes which are connected to a current source; N and M are potential electrodes which are used for the voltage measurements. As source, the direct current or low frequency alternating current is used.

The interpretation of the measurements can be performed based on the apparent resistivity values. The depth of investigation depends on the distance between the current electrodes. In order to obtain the apparent resistivity as the function of depth, the measurements for each position are performed with several different distances between current electrodes. The apparent resistivity is calculated as

$$\rho_k=k\frac{U_{MN}}{I_{AB}}$$

here, k is a geometric factor, ${U_{MN}}$ — voltage between electrodes М and N, ${I_{AB}}$ — current in the line AB. The geometric factor is defined by

$$k= \frac{2\pi}{\frac{1}{r_{AM}}-\frac{1}{r_{BM}}-\frac{1}{r_{AN}}+\frac{1}{r_{BN}} }$$

here r is the distance between electrodes.

Interpretation of gathered data is performed based on the dependency ρ_{k}(AB/2).

The application of large electrode arrays allows for reconstructing complex 3D structure of geological media (see Electrical resistivity tomography). However, the interpretation of such measurement is rather difficult. In this case, advanced interpretation techniques based on numerical methods can be applied.

== Numerical calculation freeware ==
- Solution of inverse problem
- Solution of forward problem

== See also ==
- Electrical resistivity tomography (ERT)
- Magnetotellurics
- Seismo-electromagnetics
- Telluric current
