= Induced polarization =

Imaging technique

Induced polarization (IP) is a geophysical imaging technique used to identify the electrical chargeability of subsurface materials, such as ore.

The polarization effect was originally discovered by Conrad Schlumberger when measuring the resistivity of rock.

The survey method is similar to electrical resistivity tomography (ERT), in that an electric current is transmitted into the subsurface through two electrodes, and voltage is monitored through two other electrodes.

Induced polarization is a geophysical method used extensively in mineral exploration and mining operations. Resistivity and IP methods are often applied on the ground surface using multiple four-electrode sites. In an IP survey (and when making resistivity measurements), capacitive properties of the subsurface materials are determined as well. As a result, IP surveys provide additional information about the spatial variation in lithology and grain-surface chemistry.

The IP survey can be made in time-domain and frequency-domain mode:

In the time-domain induced polarization method, the voltage response is observed as a function of time after the injected current is switched off or on.

In the frequency-domain induced polarization mode, an alternating current is injected into the ground with variable frequencies. Voltage phase-shifts are measured to evaluate the impedance spectrum at different injection frequencies — this is commonly referred to as spectral IP.

The IP method is one of the most widely used techniques in mineral exploration and in the mining industry. Additionally, IP has applications in hydrogeophysical surveying, environmental investigations and geotechnical engineering projects.

== Measurement methods ==
=== Time domain ===
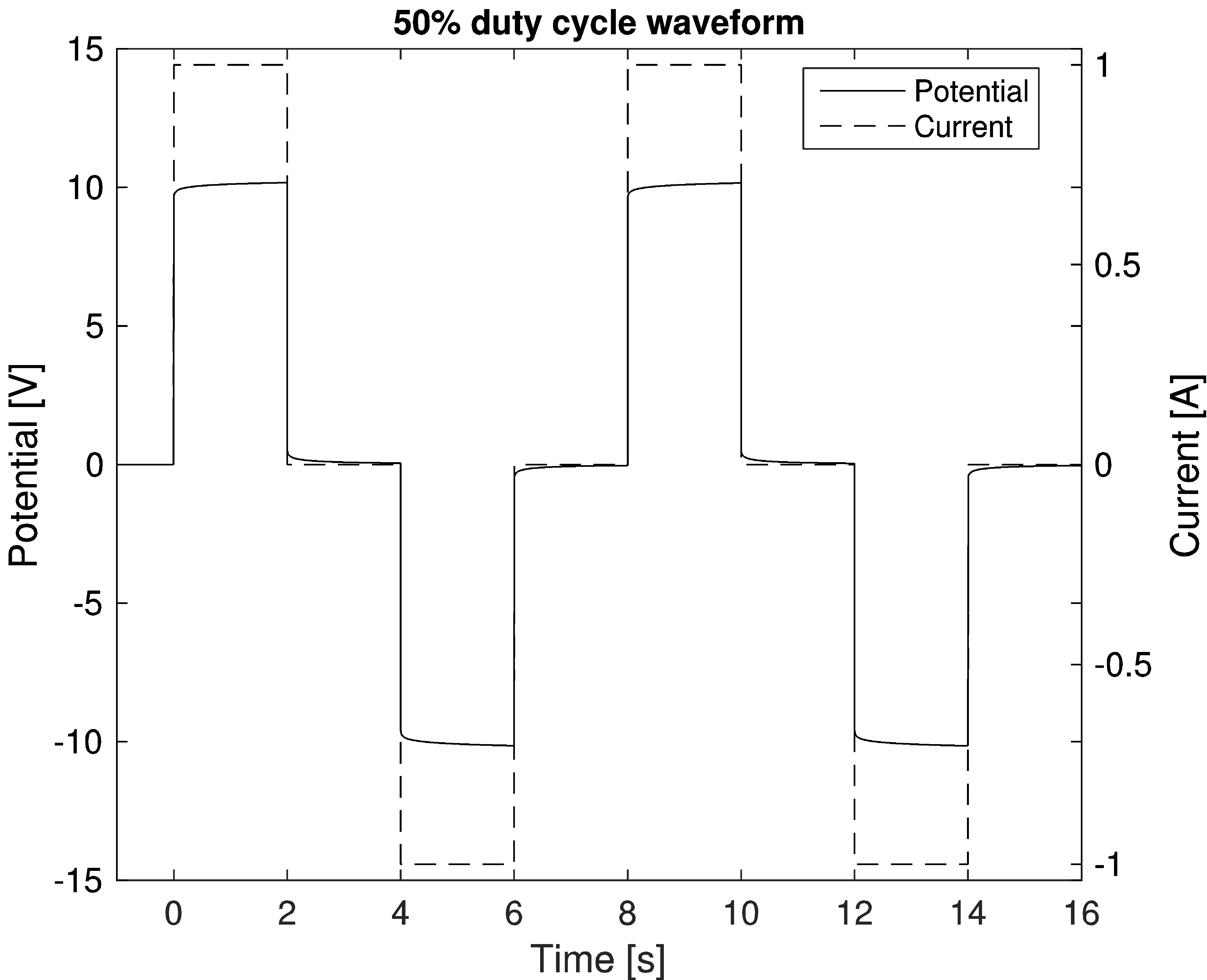
Typical transmitted current waveform and potential response for time domain resistivity and induced polarization measurements.

Time-domain IP methods measure the resulting voltage following a change in the injected current. The time domain IP potential response can be evaluated by considering the mean value on the resulting voltage, known as integral chargeability or by evaluating the spectral information and considering the shape of the potential response (i.e. describing the response with a Cole-Cole model).

=== Frequency domain ===
Frequency-domain IP methods uses alternating currents (AC) to induce electric charges in the subsurface, and the apparent resistivity is measured at different AC frequencies.

== See also ==
- DC impedance spectroscopy
- AC impedance spectroscopy
- Electrical resistivity measurement of concrete
- Geophysical imaging
