= Gustav Riehl =

Austrian dermatologist

Gustav Riehl (10 February 1855, in Wiener Neustadt – 7 January 1943, in Vienna) was an Austrian dermatologist.

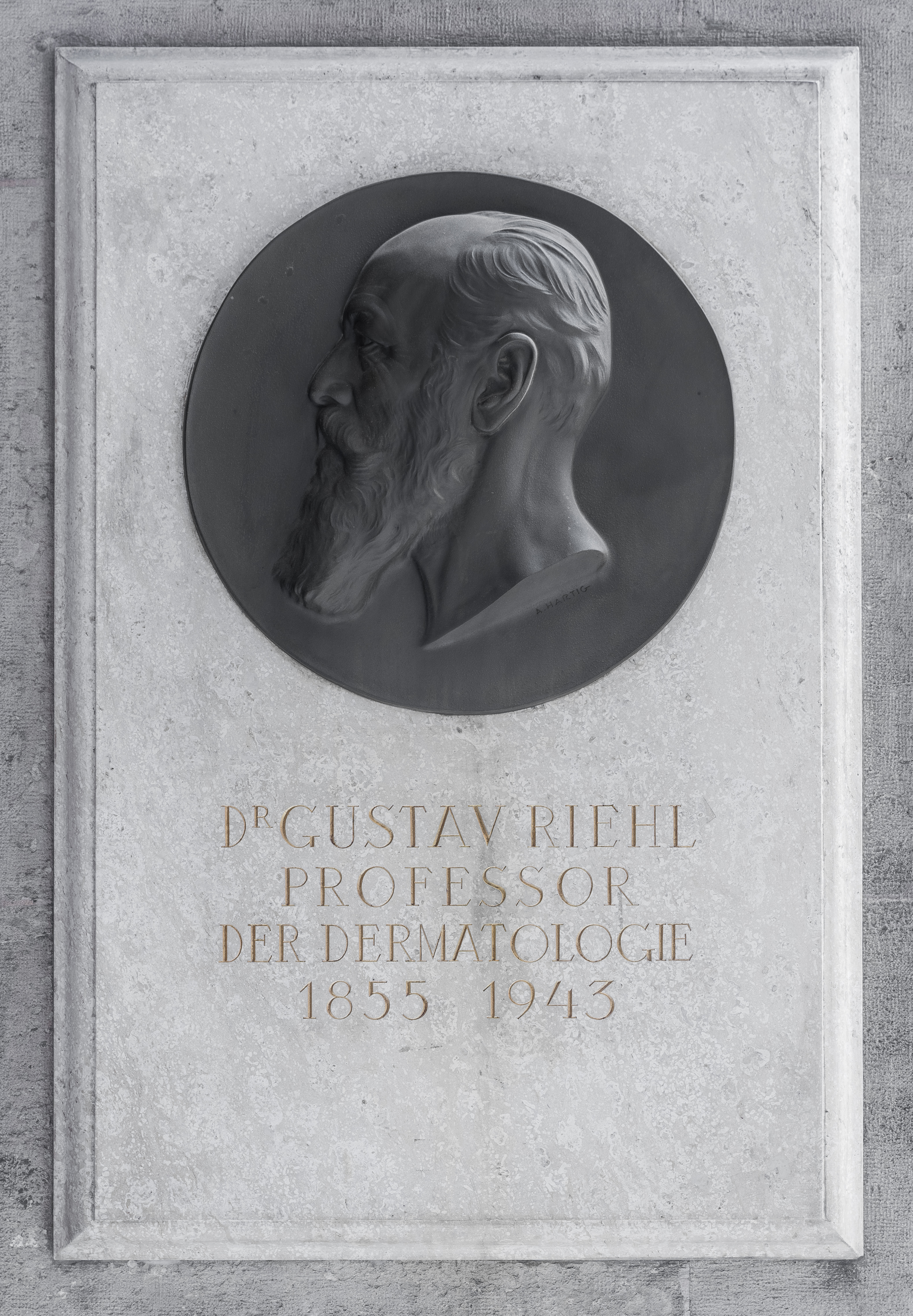
Basrelief (bronze) of Riehl in the Arkadenhof of the University of Vienna

From 1872 he studied medicine at the University of Vienna, where he later worked as an assistant in the clinic of skin diseases and syphilis under Ferdinand Ritter von Hebra and Moritz Kaposi. In 1896 he became an associate professor of dermatology and syphilology at the University of Leipzig, attaining a full professorship in 1901. In 1902 he returned to the University of Vienna, where in 1921/22 he served as academic rector.

He made contributions in his work involving skin tuberculosis, severe burn therapy, leishmaniasis, mycosis fungoides, radiation therapy, et al. In 1886, with Richard Paltauf, he described tuberculosis verrucosa cutis, and in 1917 described a type of hyperpigmentation known today as Riehl melanosis. At Vienna General Hospital he established a radiation treatment ward.

== Selected works ==
With Leo von Zumbusch, he published Atlas der Hautkrankheiten, which was translated into English and issued as Atlas of diseases of the skin. Other noted works by Riehl are:

- Über Entwicklung und Forschungswege der neueren Dermatologie, 1921 – On development and research of modern dermatology.
- Die radium- und mesothoriumtherapie der hautkrankheiten, 1924 – Radium and mesothorium therapy of skin diseases.
- Über den derzeitigen Stand der Radiumbehandlung bösartiger Geschwülste, 1926 – On the current state of radium treatment for malignant tumors.

He was also an editor of the periodical Wiener klinische Wochenschrift.
