= Marcel Bayard =

French mathematician (1895–1956)

Honoré Marcel Bayard
- Born: 3 June 1895; Chavaniac-Lafayette, France
- Died: 15 April 1956 (aged 60)
- Education: École polytechnique
- Known for: Bayard-Bode relations, Telecommunications
- Scientific career
- Fields: Telecommunication
- Workplaces: École nationale supérieure des télécommunications Société mathématique de France

Marcel Bayard (1895-1956) was a French mathematician and telecommunications engineer. He made pioneering contributions to the telecommunications theory in the 1930s. As Chief Engineer of French telecommunications after World War II, he supervised and modernized the French telecommunications system.

== Biography ==
Born in 1895, son of a farmer, he obtained his baccalauréat in 1914. He served as young officer during the World War I where he was seriously wounded and received the Croix de Guerre. He entered the École polytechnique in 1919.

In 1923 he became an engineer in the French PTT and started his career by supervising submarine cable installations. As professor at the École nationale supérieure des télécommunications, he published several noted scientific papers. He was the first to establish in 1935 what is called the “Bayard-Bode relations” (relations linking Phase and Amplitude of a signal in specific cases. He also wrote the theorical electricity lessons for the École nationale supérieure des télécommunications where he was the first in France to introduce the matrix calculations for electrical network theory.

He represented France in international telecommunications committees in the 1930s.

After World War II, he was responsible for rebuilding and modernizing the French telecommunications network.

== Membership & Honors ==
- Director of studies of the École nationale supérieure des télécommunications in 1941
- Chief Engineer of French Telecommunications in 1954.
- He was elected in 1950 vice-president of the Société mathématique de France.

== Legacy ==
- The French cable layer Marcel Bayard (fr:Marcel Bayard (câblier)) named after him was launched in 1961.

== Publications ==
- Sur la propagation des ondes le long des lignes de transmission et sur le calcul de l'onde résultante après les réflexions successives aux extrémités, bulletin de la Société française des électriciens N°23, March 1943.
- Cours d'électricité théorique, cours à l'École Nationale des Télécommunications, 1945 & 1948.
- Théorie des réseaux de Kirchhoff-Régime sinusoïdal et synthèse, collection technique et scientifique du CNET, 1954
