= Riehl melanosis =

- Specialty: Dermatology

Riehl melanosis is a form of contact dermatitis, beginning with pruritus, erythema, and pigmentation that gradually spreads which, after reaching a certain extent, becomes stationary. The pathogenesis of Riehl melanosis is believed to be sun exposure following the use of some perfumes or creams (a photocontact dermatitis).

Riehl melanosis is named after the dermatologist Gustav Riehl, who first described the condition in 1917.

== See also ==
- Skin lesion
