= Albert Tarantola =

Spanish-born French physicist

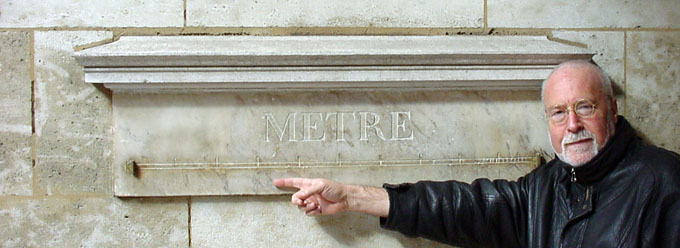
Photograph taken in 2006, at rue de Vaugirard, with one of the two original mètres still in place.

Albert Tarantola (June 15, 1949 – December 6, 2009), was a Spanish-born physicist of the University of Paris and the Institut de Physique du Globe (IPGP), and author of the book Probabilistic Formulation of Inverse Problems (Tarantola, 1987, 2005). Tarantola was the leader of the Geophysical Tomography Group, that during the years 1985—2000 developed methods for the interpretation of seismic waveform data. Beyond just this field, he is widely credited with popularizing the idea that inverse problems can be interpreted in a statistical sense, yielding the Bayesian perspective of inverse problems. Apart from his scientific research, Tarantola taught both at IPGP and at other universities.

In 2018, he was given the Maurice Ewing Medal of the Society of Exploration Geophysicists, its highest award.

== Notable publications ==
=== Books ===
- Tarantola, Albert (2005). Inverse Problem Theory and Methods for Model Parameter Estimation. SIAM. ISBN 978-0-89871-572-9.
- Tarantola, Albert (2006). Elements for Physics Quantities, Qualities, and Intrinsic Theories. Springer. ISBN 978-3-642-06452-4.

=== Scientific articles ===
- Tarantola, Albert; Valette, Bernard (1982). "Inverse Problems = Quest for Information" (PDF). Journal of Geophysics. 50: 159–170.
- Tarantola, Albert; Valette, Bernard (May 1982). "Generalized Nonlinear Inverse Problems Solved Using the Least Squares Criterion" (PDF). Reviews of Geophysics and Space Physics. 20 (2): 219–232. Bibcode:1982RvGSP..20..219T. doi:10.1029/RG020i002p00219.
- Tarantola, Albert (October 1986). "A strategy for nonlinear elastic inversion of seismic reflection data" (PDF). Geophysics. 51 (10): 1893–1903. Bibcode:1986Geop...51.1893T. doi:10.1190/1.1442046.
- Mosegaard, Klaus; Tarantola, Albert (1995). "Monte Carlo Sampling of Solutions to Inverse Problems" (PDF). Journal of Geophysical Research. 100 (B7): 12, 431–12, 447. Bibcode:1995JGR...10012431M. doi:10.1029/94jb03097.
