= Erhard Riecke =

German dermatologist and venereologist

Rudolf Erhard Riecke (11 May 1869, in Aschersleben – 15 November 1939, in Leipzig) was a German dermatologist and venereologist.

He studied medicine at the Ludwig-Maximilians-Universität München and the University of Halle, receiving his doctorate in 1895. In 1902, he obtained his habilitation for dermatology at Leipzig University, and in 1908 became an associate professor. From 1914 onward, he was a professor of dermatology at the University of Göttingen, where in 1932, he was named academic rector. In 1917, he was appointed director of the new university policlinic for skin and venereal diseases.

He is remembered for his research of ichthyosis congenita, a disease he classified into three types based on severity (ichthyosis congenita gravis, mitis and tarda). In 1900 he published Über Ichtyosis congenita regarding the disorder.

== Selected works ==
- Hygiene der Haut, Haare und Nägel, im gesunden und kranken Zustande, 1905 – Hygiene of the skin, hair and nails, in healthy and diseased conditions.
- Verzeichnis der periodischen Schriften medizinischen und naturwissenschaftlichen Inhalts in der Bibliothek, den medizinischen und naturwissenschaftlichen Instituten der Universität Leipzig (Based on Werner Spalteholz, continued by Erhard Riecke, 1907) – List of the periodicals of medical and natural sciences in the library, the medical and natural sciences institutes of the University of Leipzig.
- Lehrbuch der Haut- und Geschlechtskrankheiten (1909, 5th edition 1920) – Textbook of skin and sexual diseases.
- Creeping disease (with Johann Heinrich Rille) In: Handbuch der Hautkrankheiten, volume 4, 2, 1909 – The creeping disease.
