= Karl Willy Wagner =

German engineer (1883–1953)

- Born: 22 February 1883; Friedrichsdorf, Hesse-Nassau, German Empire
- Died: 4 September 1953 (aged 70); Friedrichsdorf, Hesse, West Germany
- Education: Technische Universität Berlin
- Known for: Maxwell–Wagner–Sillars polarization
- Scientific career
- Fields: Electrical engineering

Karl Willy Wagner (22 February 1883 – 4 September 1953) was a German pioneer in the theory of electronic filters. He is noted by Hendrik Bode as being one of two Germans whose;

. . . important contributions were slow to diffuse outside Germany because of the accidental intervention of World Wars I and II.

The other German being referred to is Wilhelm Cauer. Wagner was the second referee on Cauer's milestone 1926 thesis but Wagner fell out with Cauer in 1942 after he refused to support Wagner's research proposals with the German Society of Electrical Engineers (Verband der Elektrotechnik - the VDE).

Wagner was removed from office in 1936 because he refused to dismiss his Jewish employees.

== See also ==
- Analogue filter
- Maxwell–Wagner–Sillars polarization
