= Maxwell–Wagner–Sillars polarization =

Polarization in dielectric spectroscopy

In dielectric spectroscopy, large frequency dependent contributions to the dielectric response, especially at low frequencies, may come from build-ups of charge. This Maxwell–Wagner–Sillars polarization (or often just Maxwell–Wagner polarization), occurs either at inner dielectric boundary layers on a mesoscopic scale, or at the external electrode-sample interface on a macroscopic scale. In both cases this leads to a separation of charges (such as through a depletion layer). The charges are often separated over a considerable distance (relative to the atomic and molecular sizes), and the contribution to dielectric loss can therefore be orders of magnitude larger than the dielectric response due to molecular fluctuations. It is named after the works of James Clerk Maxwell (1873), Karl Willy Wagner (1914) and R. W. Sillars (1937).

== Occurrences ==
Maxwell-Wagner polarization processes should be taken into account during the investigation of inhomogeneous materials like suspensions or colloids, biological materials, phase separated polymers, blends, and crystalline or liquid crystalline polymers.

== Models ==
The simplest model for describing an inhomogeneous structure is a double layer arrangement of leaky dielectrics, where each layer is characterized by its absolute permittivity $\epsilon_1$, $\epsilon_2$, conductivity $\sigma_1$, $\sigma_2$, and thickness $d_1$, $d_2$. The relaxation time for such an arrangement is given by

$$\tau=\frac{\epsilon_1 d_2 + \epsilon_2 d_1}{\sigma_1 d_2 + \sigma_2 d_1}$$

(Note that if the layers have equal thickness ($d_1 = d_2$), the $d$'s cancel.) This simple geometric arrangement demonstrates how a relaxation time (a frequency dependent response) arises for the composite material, even if the individual layers consist of materials with constant (frequency-independent) properties. This is known as Maxwell relaxation; note that Maxwell actually considered any number of layers, not just two.

The two-layer stack can be described by an effective combined composite permittivity that follows a Debye relaxation frequency dependent profile. The magnitude of the relaxation step ($\Delta\varepsilon = \varepsilon_s - \varepsilon_\infty$) depends in a complex way on the mismatch between the properties of the two layers, and notably it vanishes when the two layers have equal $\epsilon/\sigma$ or when one thickness goes to zero.

In bulk 'messy' materials, Maxwell's layered model captures the essence of how inhomogeneities alone can introduce relaxation times, but it is not correct in detail. To more accurately treat three-dimensional inhomogeneities, Wagner generalized this to heterogeneous dispersions of spheres inside a medium of dielectric constant $\epsilon_1$ and introduced the statistical distribution of relaxation times. Sillars extended the theory to ellipsoidal inclusions to account for shape anisotropy.

Notation note: Certain European text books will represent the $\epsilon_1$ constant with the Greek letter ω (Omega), sometimes referred to as Doyle's constant.

== See also ==
- Debye relaxation
- Dielectric dispersion
- Dielectric function
- Dielectrophoresis
- Dipole
- Permittivity
- Ellipsometry
- Linear response function
- Kramers–Kronig relation
- Green–Kubo relations
