= Faradaic impedance =

In electrochemistry, faradaic impedance is the resistance and capacitance acting jointly at the surface of an electrode of an electrochemical cell. The cell may be operating as either a galvanic cell generating an electric current or inversely as an electrolytic cell using an electric current to drive a chemical reaction. In the simplest nontrivial case faradaic impedance is modeled as a single resistor and single capacitor connected in parallel, as opposed say to in series or as a transmission line with multiple resistors and capacitors.

== Mechanism ==
The resistance arises from the prevailing limitations on availability (local concentration) and mobility of the ions whose motion between the electrolyte and the electrode constitutes the faradaic current. The capacitance is that of the capacitor formed by the electrolyte and the electrode, separated by the Debye screening length and giving rise to the double-layer capacitance at the electrolyte-electrode interface. When the supply of ions does not meet the demand created by the potential the resistance increases, the effect being that of a constant current source or sink, and the cell is then said to be polarized at that electrode. The extent of polarization, and hence the faradaic impedance, can be controlled by varying the concentration of electrolyte ions and the temperature, by stirring the electrolyte, etc. The chemistry of the electrolyte-electrode interface is also a crucial factor.

Electrodes constructed as smooth planar sheets of metal have the least surface area. The area can be increased by using a woven mesh or porous or sintered metals. In this case faradaic impedance may be more appropriately modeled as a transmission line consisting of resistors in series coupled by capacitors in parallel.

== Dielectric spectroscopy ==
Over the past two decades faradaic impedance has emerged as the basis for an important technique in a form of spectral analysis applicable to a wide variety of materials. This technique depends on the capacitive component of faradaic impedance. Whereas the resistive component is independent of frequency and can be measured with DC, the impedance of the capacitive component is infinite at DC (zero admittance) and decreases inversely with frequency of an applied AC signal. Varying this frequency while monitoring the faradaic impedance provides a method of spectral analysis of the composition of the materials at the electrode-electrolyte interface, in particular their electric dipole moment in the role of dielectric of a capacitor. The technique yields insights into battery design, the performance of novel fuel cell designs, biomolecular interactions, etc.

== See also ==
- Dielectric spectroscopy
- Electrochemical cell
- Faradaic current
