= International Hygiene Exhibition =

1911 world's fair held in Germany

1911 Dresden
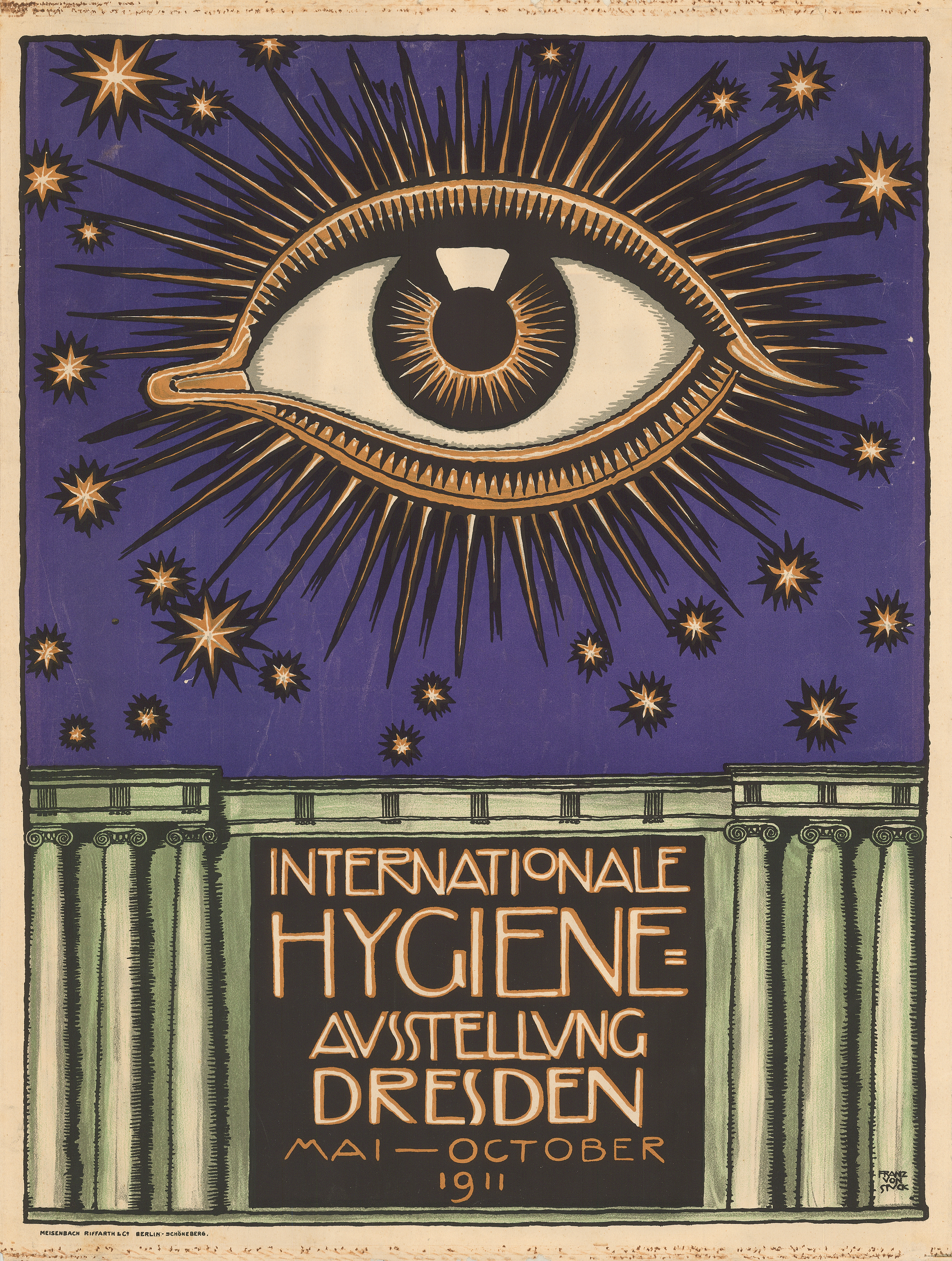
- Poster for the exhibition by Franz Stuck

Overview
- BIE-class: Unrecognized exposition
- Visitors: More than 5 million

Participant(s)
- Countries: 30

Location
- Country: German Empire
- City: Dresden

Timeline
- Opening: 6 May 1911

The International Hygiene Exhibition was a world's fair focusing on medicine and public health, held in Dresden, Germany, in 1911.

The leading figure organizing the exhibition was German philanthropist and businessman Karl August Lingner, who had grown wealthy from his Odol mouthwash brand, and was enthusiastic to educate the public about advances in public health. Lingner had previously organized a public-health exhibition as part of the 1903 Dresden municipal expo, and its success led him to plan a larger endeavor.

The exhibition opened on May 6, 1911, with 30 countries participating, 100 buildings built for the event, and 5 million visitors over its duration. It emphasized accessible visual representations of the body, and a particular sensation were the transparent organs preserved and displayed according to a method devised by Werner Spalteholz.

Following the exhibition, its contents became the permanent German Hygiene Museum in Dresden. Its success spawned several follow-up expos, most notably the 1926 GeSoLei exhibition in Düsseldorf.

Other International Exhibitions of Hygiene were held in:

- 1910: Buenos Aires, Argentina: Exposición Internacional del Centenario (1910)
- 1913: Lima, Peru
- 1914: Genoa, Italy
