= Constant phase element =

Circuit component which represents double-layer capacitance

In electronics, a constant phase element is an equivalent electrical circuit component that models the behaviour of a double layer, that is, an imperfect capacitor (see double-layer capacitance).

Constant phase elements are also used in equivalent circuit modeling and data fitting of electrochemical impedance spectroscopy data.

A constant phase element also currently appears in modeling the imperfect dielectrics' behavior. The generalization in the fields of imperfect electrical resistances, capacitances, and inductances leads to the general "phasance" concept: http://fr.scribd.com/doc/71923015/The-Phasance-Concept

== General equation ==
The electrical impedance can be calculated:

$$Z_{CPE}=\frac{1}{Y_{CPE}}=\frac{1}{Q_0\omega^n}e^{-\frac{\pi}{2}ni}$$

where the CPE admittance is: $Y_{CPE}=Q_0(\omega i)^n$ and Q_{0} and n (0<n<1) are frequency independent.

Q_{0} = 1/|Z| at ω = 1 rad/s

The constant phase is always −(90*n)°, with n from 0 to 1. The case n = 1 describes an ideal capacitor while the case n = 0 describes a pure resistor.
