= Geophysical survey (archaeology) =

Non-invasive physical sensing techniques used for archaeological imaging or mapping

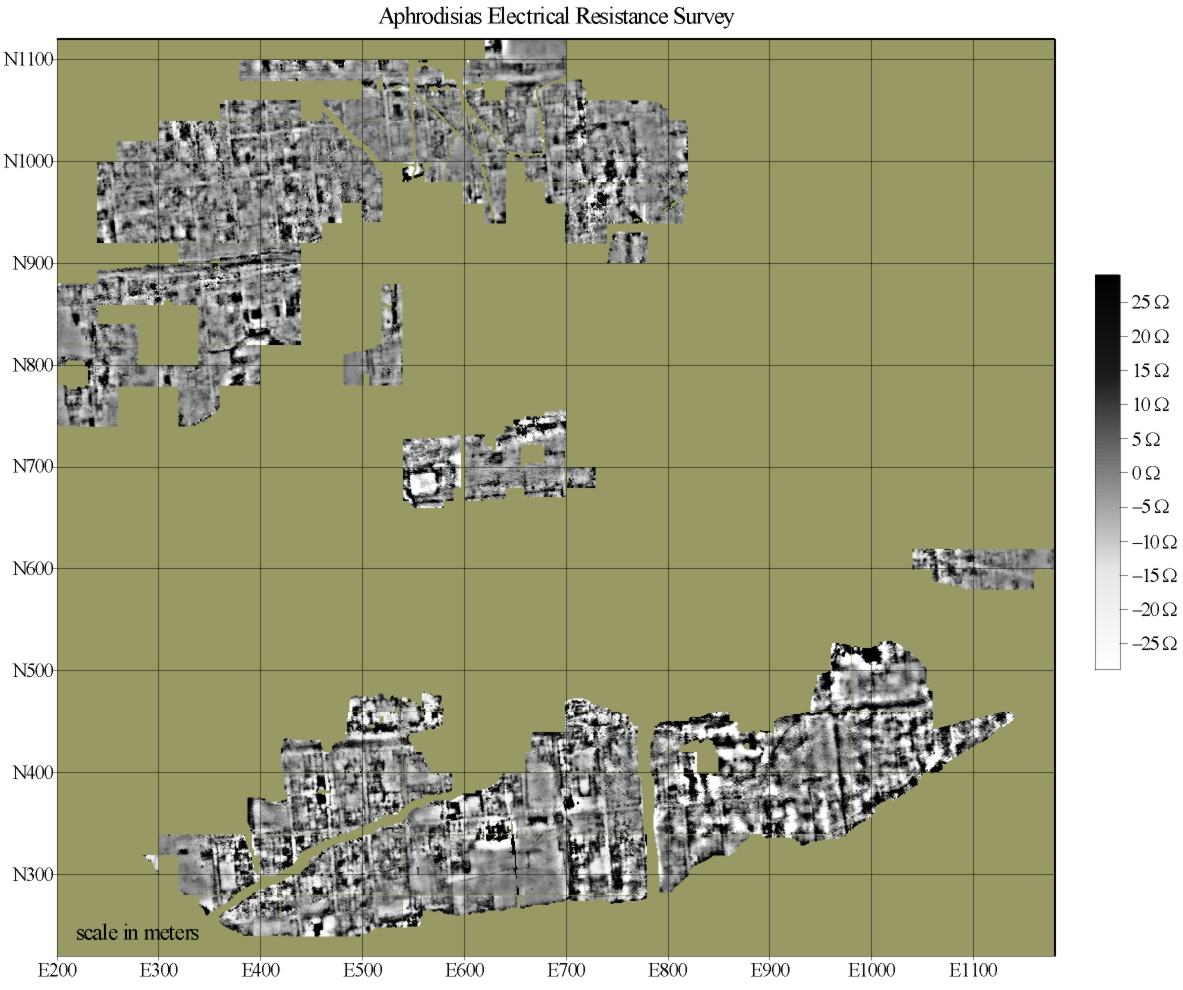
Electrical resistance map of ancient Aphrodisias

In archaeology, geophysical survey is ground-based physical sensing techniques used for archaeological imaging or mapping. Remote sensing and marine surveys are also used in archaeology, but are generally considered separate disciplines. Other terms, such as "geophysical prospection" and "archaeological geophysics" are generally synonymous.

== Overview ==
Geophysical survey is used to create maps of subsurface archaeological features. Features are the non-portable part of the archaeological record, whether standing structures or traces of human activities left in the soil. Geophysical instruments can detect buried features when their physical properties contrast measurably with their surroundings. In some cases individual artifacts, especially metal, may be detected as well. Readings taken in a systematic pattern become a data set that can be rendered as image maps. Survey results can be used to guide excavation and to give archaeologists insight into the patterning of non-excavated parts of the site. Unlike other archaeological methods, geophysical survey is neither invasive nor destructive. For this reason, it is often used where preservation (rather than excavation) is the goal, and to avoid disturbance of culturally sensitive sites such as cemeteries.

== Methods ==
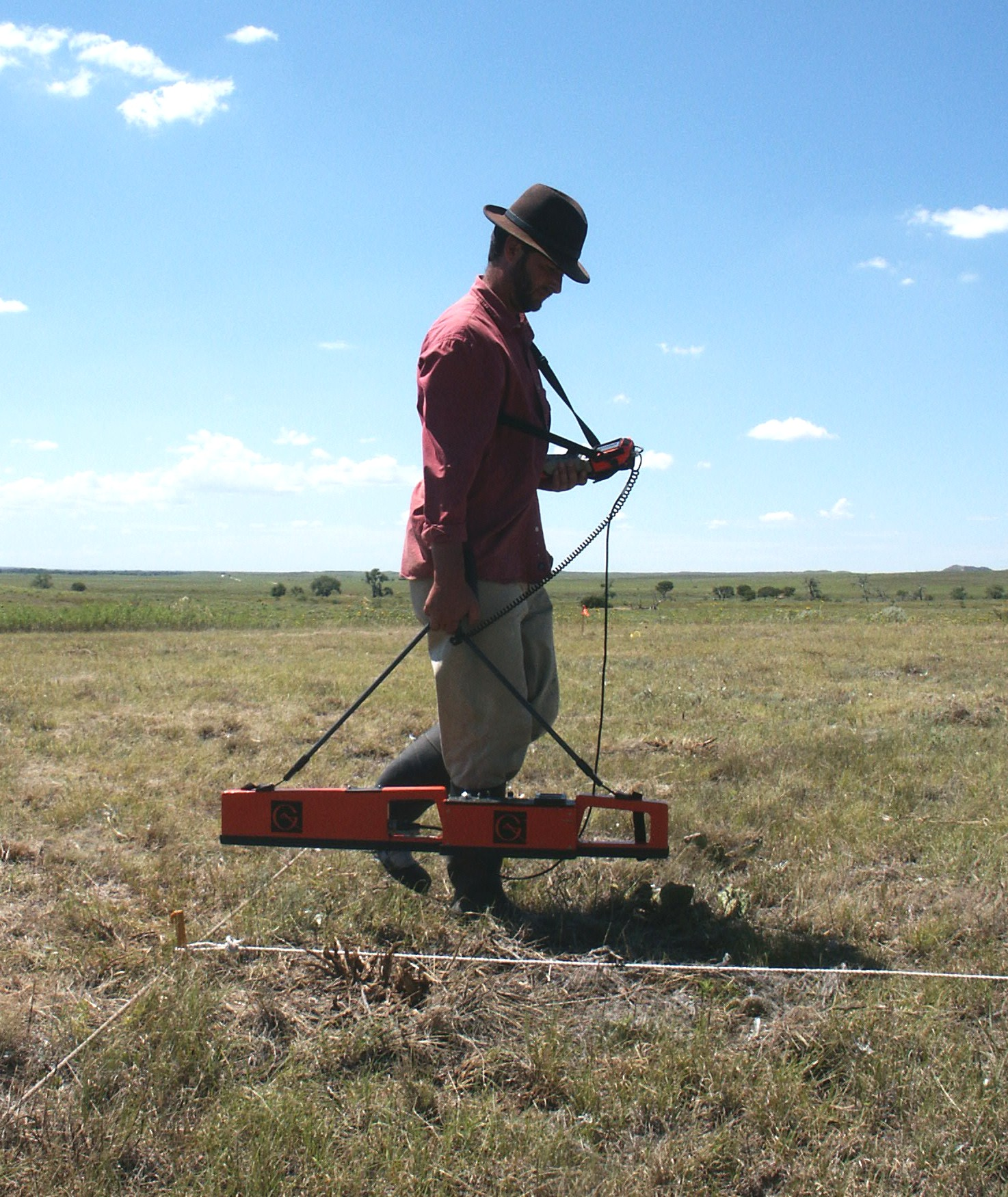
EM conductivity survey

Geophysical methods used in archaeology are largely adapted from those used in mineral exploration, engineering, and geology. Archaeological mapping presents unique challenges, however, which have spurred a separate development of methods and equipment. In general, geological applications are concerned with detecting relatively large structures, often as deeply as possible. In contrast, most archaeological sites are relatively near the surface, often within the top meter of earth. Instruments are often configured to limit the depth of response to better resolve the near-surface phenomena that are likely to be of interest. Another challenge is to detect subtle and often very small features – which may be as ephemeral as organic staining from decayed wooden posts - and distinguish them from rocks, roots, and other natural "clutter". To accomplish this requires not only sensitivity, but also high density of data points, usually at least one and sometimes dozens of readings per square meter.

Most commonly applied to archaeology are magnetometers, electrical resistance meters, ground-penetrating radar (GPR) and electromagnetic (EM) conductivity meters. These methods can resolve many types of archaeological features, are capable of high sample density surveys of very large areas, and of operating under a wide range of conditions. While common metal detectors are geophysical sensors, they are not capable of generating high-resolution imagery. Other established and emerging technologies are also finding use in archaeological applications.

Electrical resistance meters can be thought of as similar to the Ohmmeters used to test electrical circuits. In most systems, metal probes are inserted into the ground to obtain a reading of the local electrical resistance. A variety of probe configurations are used, most having four probes, often mounted on a rigid frame. Capacitively coupled systems that do not require direct physical contact with the soil have also been developed. Archaeological features can be mapped when they are of higher or lower resistivity than their surroundings. A stone foundation might impede the flow of electricity, while the organic deposits within a midden might conduct electricity more easily than surrounding soils. Although generally used in archaeology for planview mapping, resistance methods also have a limited ability to discriminate depth and create vertical profiles (see Electrical resistivity tomography).

Electromagnetic (EM) conductivity instruments have a response that is comparable to that of resistance meters (conductivity is the inverse of resistance). Underground archaeological features are detected by creating a magnetic field underground by applying an electric current that has a known frequency and magnitude through a sending coil. The currents spur a secondary current in underground conductors that is picked up by a receiving coil. Changes in the underground conductivity can indicate buried features. Although EM conductivity instruments are generally less sensitive than resistance meters to the same phenomena, they do have a number of unique properties. One advantage is that they do not require direct contact with the ground, and can be used in conditions unfavorable to resistance meters. Another advantage is relatively greater speed than resistance instruments. Unlike resistance instruments, conductivity meters respond strongly to metal. This can be a disadvantage when the metal is extraneous to the archaeological record, but can be useful when the metal is of archaeological interest. Some EM conductivity instruments are also capable of measuring magnetic susceptibility, a property that is becoming increasingly important in archaeological studies.

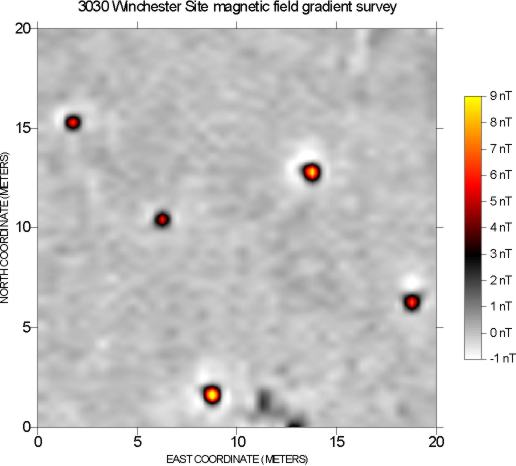
Magnetic gradiometer map of Prehistoric fire-hearths

Magnetometers used in geophysical survey may use a single sensor to measure the total magnetic field strength, or may use two (sometimes more) spatially separated sensors to measure the gradient of the magnetic field (the difference between the sensors). In most archaeological applications the latter (gradiometer) configuration is preferred because it provides better resolution of small, near-surface phenomena. Magnetometers may also use a variety of different sensor types. Proton precession magnetometers have largely been superseded by faster and more sensitive fluxgate and caesium instruments.

Every kind of material has unique magnetic properties, even those that we do not think of as being "magnetic". Different materials below the ground can cause local disturbances in the Earth's magnetic field that are detectable with sensitive magnetometers. Magnetometers react very strongly to iron and steel, brick, burned soil, and many types of rock, and archaeological features composed of these materials are very detectable. Where these highly magnetic materials do not occur, it is often possible to detect very subtle anomalies caused by disturbed soils or decayed organic materials. The chief limitation of magnetometer survey is that subtle features of interest may be obscured by highly magnetic geologic or modern materials.

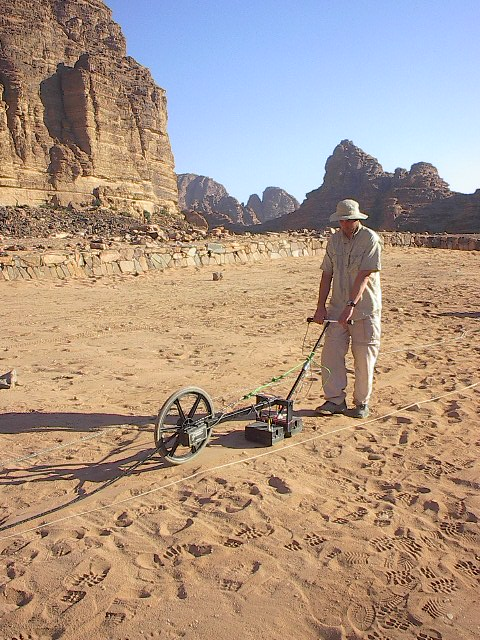
GPR survey

Ground-penetrating radar (GPR) is perhaps the best known of these methods (although it is not the most widely applied in archaeology). The concept of radar is familiar to most people. In this instance, the radar signal – an electromagnetic pulse – is directed into the ground. Subsurface objects and stratigraphy (layering) will cause reflections that are picked up by a receiver. The travel time of the reflected signal indicates the depth. Data may be plotted as profiles, or as planview maps isolating specific depths.

GPR can be a powerful tool in favorable conditions (uniform sandy soils are ideal). It is unique both in its ability to detect some spatially small objects at relatively great depths and in its ability to distinguish the depth of anomaly sources. The principal disadvantage of GPR is that it is severely limited by less-than-ideal conditions. The high electrical conductivity of fine-grained sediments (clays and silts) causes conductive losses of signal strength; rocky or heterogeneous sediments scatter the GPR signal.

Metal detectors use electromagnetic induction to detect metal. Although other types of instruments (notably magnetometers and electromagnetic conductivity meters) have some sensitivity to metal, specialized metal detectors are much more effective. Metal detectors are available in different configurations, varying in sophistication and sensitivity. Most have some capacity to discriminate between different types of metallic targets.

Common hand-held metal detectors are widely used by archaeologists. Most of these instruments do not create a logged data set and thus cannot be used for directly creating maps, but used in a systematic manner they can be a useful tool in archaeological research. Sometimes external data loggers are attached to such detectors which collect information about detected materials and corresponding gps coordinates for further processing. Misuse of these instruments on archaeological sites by treasure hunters and artifact collectors has been a serious problem in archaeological preservation however cooperative efforts between skilled amateur operators and academic teams are emerging in the field.

Although not as commonly used in archaeology, sophisticated metal detectors are available having much greater sensitivity than hand-held models. These instruments are capable of data logging and sophisticated target discrimination. They can be mounted on wheeled carts for survey data collection.

Lidar is an optical remote sensing technology that can measure the distance to a target by illuminating the target with light, often using pulses from a laser. Lidar has many applications in the field of archaeology including aiding in the planning of field campaigns, mapping features beneath forest canopy, and providing an overview of broad, continuous features that may be indistinguishable on the ground. Lidar can also provide archaeologists with the ability to create high-resolution digital elevation models (DEMs) of archaeological sites that can reveal micro-topography that are otherwise hidden by vegetation. Lidar-derived products can be easily integrated into a Geographic Information System (GIS) for analysis and interpretation.

Data collection is broadly similar regardless of the particular sensing instrument. Survey usually involves walking with the instrument along closely spaced parallel traverses, taking readings at regular intervals. In most cases, a grid system is marked on the ground to provide spatial control. With marked grid points as a reference, the instrument operator uses tapes or marked ropes as a guide when collecting data. In this way, positioning error can be kept to within a few centimeters for high-resolution mapping. Survey systems with integrated Global Navigation Satellite Systems (GNSS) have been developed. In open site conditions these can facilitate survey without the need for establishing a local grid system. GNSS systems generally require RTK (rather than SBAS) correction system correction) for high-resolution archaeological mapping. Geophysical instruments (notably metal detectors) may also used for less formally "scanning" areas of interest.

Data processing and imaging convert raw numeric data into interpretable maps. Data processing usually involves the removal of statistical outliers and noise, and interpolation of data points. Statistical filters may be designed to enhance features of interest (based on size, strength, orientation, or other criteria), or suppress obscuring modern or natural phenomena. Inverse modeling of archaeological features from observed data is becoming increasingly important. Processed data are typically rendered as images, as contour maps, or in false relief. When geophysical data are rendered graphically, the interpreter can more intuitively recognize cultural and natural patterns and visualize the physical phenomena causing the detected anomalies.

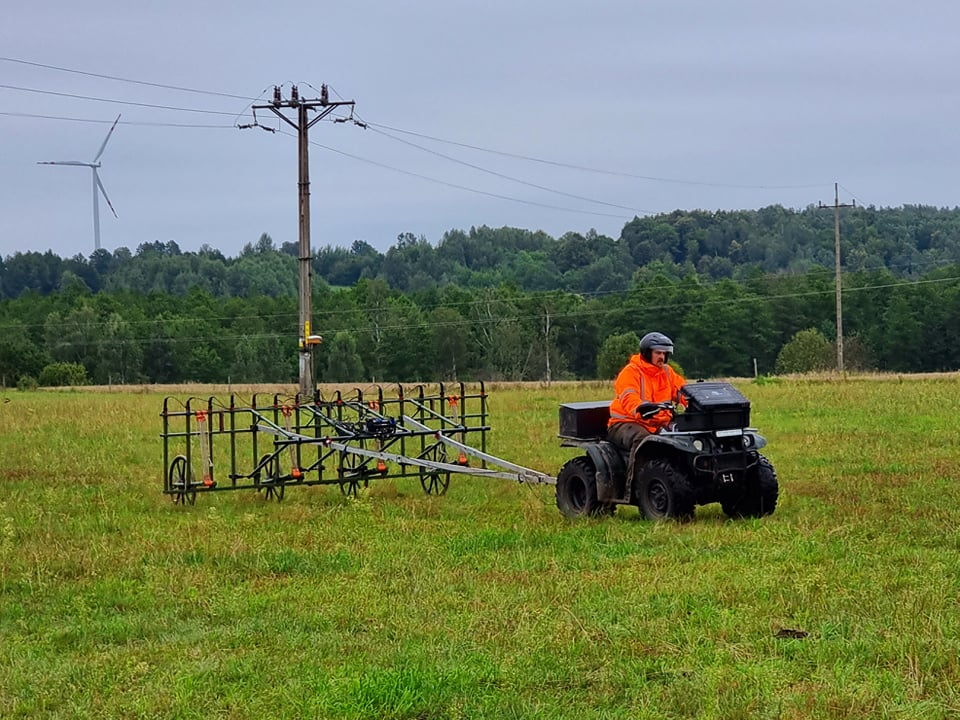
Geophysical survey using magnetometer

== Development ==
A magnetic survey at Pembroke Castle carried out by Dyfed Archaeological Trust.

The use of geophysical surveys is well established in European archaeology, especially in Great Britain, where it was pioneered in the 1940s and 1950s. It is increasingly employed in other parts of the world and with increasing success as techniques are adapted to unique regional conditions.

In early surveys, measurements were recorded individually and plotted by hand. Although beneficial results were sometimes obtained, practical applications were limited by the enormous amount of labor required. Data processing was minimal, and sample densities were necessarily low.

Although sensor sensitivity has improved and new methods have been developed, the most important developments have been automated data logging and computers that can handle and process large amounts of data. Increases in survey equipment performance and automation have made it possible to survey large areas rapidly. Rapid data collection has also made achieving the high sample densities necessary to resolve small or subtle features practical. Advances in processing and imaging software have made it possible to detect, display, and interpret subtle archaeological patterning within the geophysical data.

== See also ==
- Archaeological field survey
- Magnetic survey (archaeology)
- Ground penetrating radar survey (archaeology)
- Electrical resistance survey (archaeology)
- Remote sensing (archaeology)
