= Kramers–Kronig relations =

Type of mathematical relation

The Kramers–Kronig relations, sometimes abbreviated as KK relations, are bidirectional mathematical relations, connecting the real and imaginary parts of any complex function that is analytic in the upper half-plane. The relations are often used to compute the real part from the imaginary part (or vice versa) of response functions in physical systems, because for stable systems, causality implies the condition of analyticity, and conversely, analyticity implies causality of the corresponding stable physical system. The relation is named in honor of Ralph Kronig and Hans Kramers. In mathematics, these relations are known by the names Sokhotski–Plemelj theorem and Hilbert transform.

== Formulation ==
Illustration for one of the Kramers–Kronig relations, determining the real part of the susceptibility given the imaginary part.

Let $\chi(\omega) = \chi_1(\omega) + i \chi_2(\omega)$ be a complex function of the complex variable $\omega$, where $\chi_1(\omega)$ and $\chi_2(\omega)$ are real. Suppose this function is analytic in the closed upper half-plane of $\omega$ and tends to $0$ as $|\omega| \to \infty$. The Kramers–Kronig relations are given by
$$\chi_1(\omega) =  \frac{1}{\pi} \mathcal{P}\!\!\int_{-\infty}^\infty \frac{\chi_2(\omega')}{\omega' - \omega}\,d\omega'$$
and
$$\chi_2(\omega) = -\frac{1}{\pi} \mathcal{P}\!\!\int_{-\infty}^\infty \frac{\chi_1(\omega')}{\omega' - \omega}\,d\omega',$$
where $\omega$ is real and where $\mathcal{P}$ denotes the Cauchy principal value.

The real and imaginary parts of such a function are not independent, allowing the full function to be reconstructed given just one of its parts.

== Derivation ==
Integral contour for deriving Kramers–Kronig relations

The proof begins with an application of Cauchy's residue theorem for complex integration. Given any analytic function $\chi$ in the closed upper half-plane, the function $\omega' \mapsto \chi(\omega') / (\omega' - \omega)$, where $\omega$ is real, is analytic in the (open) upper half-plane. The residue theorem consequently states that
$$\oint \frac{\chi(\omega')}{\omega' - \omega}\,d\omega' = 0$$
for any closed contour within this region. When the contour is chosen to trace the real axis, a hump over the pole at $\omega' = \omega$, and a large semicircle in the upper half-plane. This follows decomposition of the integral into its contributions along each of these three contour segments and pass them to limits. The length of the semicircular segment increases proportionally to $|\omega'|$, but the integral over it vanishes in the limit because $\frac{\chi(\omega')}{\omega' - \omega}$ vanishes faster than $1 / |\omega'|$. We are left with the segments along the real axis and the half-circle around the pole. We pass the size of the half-circle to zero and obtain
$$0 = \oint \frac{\chi(\omega')}{\omega' - \omega}\,d\omega' =
\mathcal{P}\!\!\int_{-\infty}^\infty \frac{\chi(\omega')}{\omega' - \omega}\,d\omega' - i \pi \chi(\omega).$$

The second term in the last expression is obtained using the theory of residues, more specifically, the Sokhotski–Plemelj theorem. Rearranging, we arrive at the compact form of the Kramers–Kronig relations:
$$\chi(\omega) = \frac{1}{i \pi} \mathcal{P}\!\!\int_{-\infty}^\infty \frac{\chi(\omega')}{\omega' - \omega}\,d\omega'.$$

The single $i$ in the denominator effectuates the connection between the real and imaginary components. Finally, split $\chi(\omega)$ and the equation into their real and imaginary parts to obtain the forms quoted above.

== Physical interpretation and alternate form ==
The Kramers–Kronig formalism can be applied to response functions. In certain linear physical systems, or in engineering fields such as signal processing, the response function $\chi(t-t')$ describes how some time-dependent property $P(t)$ of a physical system responds to an impulse force $F(t')$ at time $t'.$ For example, $P(t)$ could be the angle of a pendulum and $F(t)$ the applied force of a motor driving the pendulum motion. The response $\chi(t-t')$ must be zero for $t < t'$ since a system cannot respond to a force before it is applied. It can be shown (for instance, by invoking Titchmarsh's theorem) that this causality condition implies that the Fourier transform $\chi(\omega)$ of $\chi(t)$ is analytic in the upper half plane. Additionally, if the system is subjected to an oscillatory force with a frequency much higher than its highest resonant frequency, there will be almost no time for the system to respond before the forcing has switched direction, and so the frequency response $\chi(\omega)$ will converge to zero as $\omega$ becomes very large. From these physical considerations, it results that $\chi(\omega)$ will typically satisfy the conditions needed for the Kramers–Kronig relations.

The real part of a response function describes how a system dissipates energy, since it is in phase with the driving force. The Kramers–Kronig relations imply that observing the dissipative response of a system is sufficient to determine its out of phase (reactive) response, and vice versa.

The integrals run from $-\infty$ to $\infty$, implying we know the response at negative frequencies. Fortunately, in most physical systems, the positive frequency-response determines the negative-frequency response because $\chi(\omega)$ is the Fourier transform of a real-valued response $\chi(t)$. We will make this assumption henceforth.

As a consequence, $\chi(-\omega) = \chi^*(\omega)$. This means $\chi_1(\omega)$ is an even function of frequency and $\chi_2(\omega)$ is odd.

Using these properties, we can collapse the integration ranges to $[0,\infty)$. Consider the first relation, which gives the real part $\chi_1(\omega)$. We transform the integral into one of definite parity by multiplying the numerator and denominator of the integrand by $\omega' + \omega$ and separating:
$$\chi_1(\omega) = {1 \over \pi} \mathcal{P}\!\! \int_{-\infty}^\infty {\omega' \chi_2(\omega') \over \omega'^2 - \omega^2}\, d\omega' + {\omega \over \pi} \mathcal{P}\!\! \int_{-\infty}^\infty {\chi_2(\omega') \over \omega'^2 - \omega^2}\,d\omega'.$$

Since $\chi_2(\omega)$ is odd, the second integral vanishes, and we are left with
$$\chi_1(\omega) = {2 \over \pi} \mathcal{P}\!\! \int_0^\infty {\omega' \chi_2(\omega') \over \omega'^2 - \omega^2}\,d\omega'.$$

The same derivation for the imaginary part gives
$$\chi_2(\omega) = -{2 \over \pi} \mathcal{P}\!\! \int_0^\infty {\omega \chi_1(\omega') \over \omega'^2 - \omega^2}\,d\omega' = -{2 \omega \over \pi} \mathcal{P}\!\! \int_0^\infty {\chi_1(\omega') \over \omega'^2 - \omega^2}\,d\omega'.$$

These are the Kramers–Kronig relations in a form that is useful for physically realistic response functions.

== Related proof from the time domain ==
Hu and Hall and Heck give a related and possibly more intuitive proof that avoids contour integration. It is based on the facts that:

- A causal impulse response can be expressed as the sum of an even function and an odd function, where the odd function is the even function multiplied by the sign function.
- The even and odd parts of a time domain waveform correspond to the real and imaginary parts of its Fourier integral, respectively.
- Multiplication by the sign function in the time domain corresponds to the Hilbert transform (i.e. convolution by the Hilbert kernel $1 / \pi \omega$) in the frequency domain.

Combining the formulas provided by these facts yields the Kramers–Kronig relations. This proof covers slightly different ground from the previous one in that it relates the real and imaginary parts in the frequency domain of any function that is causal in the time domain, offering an approach somewhat different from the condition of analyticity in the upper half plane of the frequency domain.

An article with an informal, pictorial version of this proof is also available.

== Magnitude (gain)–phase relation ==
The conventional form of Kramers–Kronig above relates the real and imaginary part of a complex response function. A related goal is to find a relation between the magnitude and phase of a complex response function.

In general, unfortunately, the phase cannot be uniquely predicted from the magnitude. A simple example of this is a pure time delay of time T, which has amplitude 1 at any frequency regardless of T, but has a phase dependent on T (specifically, phase = 2π × T × frequency).

There is, however, a unique amplitude-vs-phase relation in the special case of a minimum phase system, sometimes called the Bode gain–phase relation. The terms Bayard–Bode relations and Bayard–Bode theorem, after the works of Marcel Bayard (1936) and Hendrik Wade Bode (1945) are also used for either the Kramers–Kronig relations in general or the amplitude–phase relation in particular, particularly in the fields of telecommunication and control theory.

== Applications in physics ==
=== Optics ===
==== Complex refractive index ====
The Kramers–Kronig relations are used to relate the real and imaginary portions for the complex refractive index $\tilde{n} = n+i\kappa$ of a medium, where $\kappa$ is the extinction coefficient. Hence, in effect, this also applies for the complex relative permittivity and electric susceptibility.

The Sellmeier equation is directly connected to the Kramer-Kronig relations, and is used to approximate real and complex refractive index of materials far away from any resonances.

==== Circular birefringence ====
In optical rotation, the Kramers–Kronig relations establish a connection between optical rotary dispersion and circular dichroism.

==== Magneto-optics ====
Kramers–Kronig relations enable exact solutions of nontrivial scattering problems, which find applications in magneto-optics.

==== Ellipsometry ====
In ellipsometry, Kramer-Kronig relations are applied to verify the measured values for the real and complex parts of the refractive index of thin films.

=== Electron spectroscopy ===
In electron energy loss spectroscopy, Kramers–Kronig analysis allows one to calculate the energy dependence of both real and imaginary parts of a specimen's light optical permittivity, together with other optical properties such as the absorption coefficient and reflectivity.

In short, by measuring the number of high energy (e.g. 200 keV) electrons which lose a given amount of energy in traversing a very thin specimen (single scattering approximation), one can calculate the imaginary part of permittivity at that energy. Using this data with Kramers–Kronig analysis, one can calculate the real part of permittivity (as a function of energy) as well.

This measurement is made with electrons, rather than with light, and can be done with very high spatial resolution. One might thereby, for example, look for ultraviolet (UV) absorption bands in a laboratory specimen of interstellar dust less than a 100 nm across, i.e. too small for UV spectroscopy. Although electron spectroscopy has poorer energy resolution than light spectroscopy, data on properties in visible, ultraviolet and soft x-ray spectral ranges may be recorded in the same experiment.

In angle resolved photoemission spectroscopy the Kramers–Kronig relations can be used to link the real and imaginary parts of the electrons self-energy. This is characteristic of the many body interaction the electron experiences in the material. Notable examples are in the high temperature superconductors, where kinks corresponding to the real part of the self-energy are observed in the band dispersion and changes in the MDC width are also observed corresponding to the imaginary part of the self-energy.

=== Hadronic scattering ===
The Kramers–Kronig relations are also used under the name "integral dispersion relations" with reference to hadronic scattering. In this case, the function is the scattering amplitude. Through the use of the optical theorem the imaginary part of the scattering amplitude is then related to the total cross section, which is a physically measurable quantity.

=== Electron scattering ===
Similarly to Hadronic scattering, the Kramers–Kronig relations are employed in high energy electron scattering. In particular, they enter the derivation of the Gerasimov–Drell–Hearn sum rule.

=== Geophysics ===
For seismic wave propagation, the Kramer–Kronig relation helps to find the correct form for the quality factor in an attenuating medium.

=== Electrochemical impedance spectroscopy ===
The Kramers-Kronig test is used in battery and fuel cell applications (dielectric spectroscopy) to test for linearity, causality and stationarity. Since, it is not possible in practice to obtain data in the whole frequency range, as the Kramers-Kronig formula requires, approximations are necessarily made.

At high frequencies (> 1 MHz) it is usually safe to assume, that the impedance is dominated by ohmic resistance of the electrolyte, although inductance artefacts are often observed.

At low frequencies, the KK test can be used to verify whether experimental data are reliable. In battery practice, data obtained with experiments of duration less than one minute usually fail the test for frequencies below 10 Hz. Therefore, care should be exercised, when interpreting such data.

In electrochemistry practice, due to the finite frequency range of experimental data, Z-HIT relation is used instead of Kramers-Kronig relations. Unlike Kramers-Kronig (which is written for an infinite frequency range), Z-HIT integration requires only a finite frequency range. Furthermore, Z-HIT is more robust with respect to error in the Re and Im of impedance, since its accuracy depends mostly on the accuracy of the phase data.

== Applications in biology and medicine ==
=== Tissue clearing ===
The Kramers–Kronig relations can be exploited to modulate the refractive indices of tissue components such as water and lipids. By altering optical absorption at specific wavelengths, these relations link changes in absorption, which is essentially the imaginary refractive index, $\kappa$, to corresponding changes in real refractive index, $n$. When applied to biological tissue, this principle can be used to homogenize refractive indices among different tissue constituents, thereby reducing light scattering in volumetric tissue and enabling optical tissue clearing.

In 2024, Hong, Brongersma, and Ou reported the first demonstration that the Kramers–Kronig relations can be leveraged to induce optical transparency in live mammalian animals. In their study, an aqueous solution of the food dye tartrazine was applied to live mice, resulting in a transient and reversible increase in the optical transparency of certain biological tissues, including skin. The authors attributed this effect to tartrazine's strong absorption in the blue region of the visible spectrum and the associated modulation of refractive index at longer wavelengths, in accordance with the Kramers–Kronig relations. Following the initial report, multiple independent research groups reproduced and extended the approach, demonstrating the use of in vivo optical clearing across a range of biological imaging applications. Emerging studies further showed that, as predicted by the Kramers–Kronig relations, a broad class of absorbing dye molecules beyond tartrazine can be repurposed as optical clearing agents by inducing refractive-index modulation in biological tissues, a prediction that has since been validated experimentally.

== See also ==
- Dispersion (optics)
- Linear response function
- Numerical analytic continuation
