= Geophysical Tomography Group =

French research center

The group's logo reflected its name, but also a famous formula in least-squares optimization: transpose of G times G.

The Geophysical Tomography Group was part of the Institut de Physique du Globe de Paris (Jussieu Campus). During the years 1985-2000 it made developments in the domain of nonlinear fitting of seismic waveforms. The work of the group has been described as pioneering.

== History ==
First fully elastic nonlinear waveform fitting of exploration data (vertical seismic profile). From Charara et al., 2000.

By the year 1985, the imaging methods used by the oil industry were based in signal-processing concepts, and it seemed that modern methods, based on careful waveform modeling and waveform fitting optimization were desirable. The team tried to make real-life demonstrations that the methods of inverse theory could be applied to the imaging problem typical of seismic exploration. The GTG was founded by Albert Tarantola, who authored an influential paper on the inversion of seismic reflection data. The GTG published work on fully nonlinear waveform fitting is possible on seismic exploration data, using elastic modeling and gradient-based optimization techniques (adjoint methods).

The group's work in Monte Carlo method for waveform fitting is being integrated in present-day developments.
