= Wiener klinische Wochenschrift =

- Discipline: Medicine
- Language: English
- Edited by: Gerold Stanek

Publication details
- History: 1888-present
- Publisher: Springer Nature
- Frequency: Monthly
- Impact factor: 1.170 (2018)

Standard abbreviations
- ISO 4: Wien. Klin. Wochenschr.

Indexing
- CODEN: WKWOAO
- ISSN: 0043-5325 (print); 1613-7671 (web)
- LCCN: ca23000193
- OCLC no.: 746954927

Links
- Journal homepage; Online archive

The Wiener klinische Wochenschrift (subtitled The Central European Journal of Medicine) is a monthly peer-reviewed medical journal that was established in 1888. It is the official organ of three medical societies in Austria: the Österreichische Gesellschaft für Innere Medizin, Österreichischen Kardiologischen Gesellschaft, and Österreichische Gesellschaft für Pneumologie. It is published by Springer Nature and the editor-in-chief is Gerold Stanek (Medical University of Vienna).

== Abstracting and indexing ==
The journal is abstracted and indexed in:

- Academic OneFile
- Biological Abstracts
- BIOSIS Previews
- CAB Abstracts
- CAB International
- Current Contents/Clinical Medicine
- Chemical Abstracts Service
- EBSCO databases
- Embase
- Global Health
- Index Medicus/MEDLINE/PubMed
- Science Citation Index
- Scopus

According to the Journal Citation Reports, the journal has a 2018 impact factor of 1.170.
