= Werner Spalteholz =

German anatomist

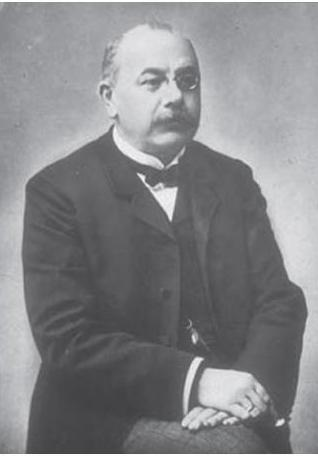
Werner Spalteholz

Werner Spalteholz (27 February 1861 in Dresden – 12 January 1940 in Leipzig) was a German anatomist.

From 1880 to 1885 he studied medicine at the University of Leipzig, where in 1891 he obtained his habilitation for anatomy. In 1892 he became an associate professor and curator of the anatomical collections at the university. During World War I, he initially served as chief physician, then as director, of a reserve hospital in Zwickau. He was instrumental towards the establishment of the German Hygiene Museum in Dresden.

He is credited for developing a method for making human tissue translucent by drenching it in liquids with similar light refraction properties as the tissue. Examples of transparent organ specimens that he produced were put on display at the First International Hygiene Exposition in Dresden (1911).

== Published works ==
He was the author of the three volume "Handbuch der Anatomie des Menschen". It was published over many editions and subsequently translated into English as: "Hand atlas of human anatomy" (1901–03);

- Vol. 1. Bones, joints, ligaments.
- Vol. 2. Regions, muscles, fasciae, heart, blood-vessels.
- Vol. 3. Viscera, brain, nerves, sense-organs.

Other noteworthy written efforts by Spalteholz are:

- Die Vertheilung der Blutgefässe im Muskel, 1888 – the distribution of blood vessels in muscle.
- Die Arterien der menschlichen Haut, 1895 – The blood vessels of the human skin.
- Verzeichnis der periodischen Schriften medizinischen und naturwissenschaftlichen Inhalts in der Bibliothek, den medizinischen und naturwissenschaftlichen Instituten der Universität Leipzig (Based on Werner Spalteholz, continued by Erhard Riecke, 1907) – List of the periodicals of medical and natural sciences in the library, the medical and natural sciences institutes of the University of Leipzig.
- Über das Durchsichtigmachen von menschlichen und tierischen Präparaten, nebst Anhang: Über Knochenfärbung, 1911 – On transparentized human and animal specimens, including notes on bone staining.
