= Electrical resistivity measurement of concrete =

Concrete electrical resistivity can be obtained by applying a current into the concrete and measuring the response voltage. There are different methods for measuring concrete resistivity.

== Laboratory methods ==
=== Two electrodes ===
Concrete electrical resistance can be measured by applying a current using two electrodes attached to the ends of a uniform cross-section specimen. Electrical resistivity is obtained from the equation:

$$\rho = R \frac{A}{\ell}, \,\!$$

R is the electrical resistance of the specimen, the ratio of voltage to current (measured in ohms, Ω)
$\ell$ is the length of the piece of material (measured in metres, m)
A is the cross-sectional area of the specimen (measured in square metres, m^{2}).

This method suffers from the disadvantage that contact resistance can significantly add to the measured resistance causing inaccuracy. Conductive gels are used to improve the contact of the electrodes with the sample.

=== Four electrodes ===
The problem of contact resistance can be overcome by using four electrodes. The two end electrodes are used to inject current as before, but the voltage is measured between the two inner electrodes. The effective length of the sample being measured is the distance between the two inner electrodes. Modern voltage meters draw very little current so there is no significant current through the voltage electrodes and hence no voltage drop across the contact resistances.

=== Transformer method ===
In this method a transformer is used to measure resistivity without any direct contact with the specimen. The transformer consists of a primary coil which energises the circuit with an AC voltage and a secondary which is formed by a toroid of the concrete sample. The current in the sample is detected by a current coil wound around a section of the toroid (a current transformer). This method is good for measuring the setting properties of concrete, its hydration and strength. Wet concrete has a resistivity of around 1 Ω-m which progressively increases as the cement sets.

== On-site methods ==
=== Four probes ===
On-site electrical resistivity of concrete is commonly measured using four probes in a Wenner array. The reason for using four probes is the same as in the laboratory method - to overcome contact errors. In this method four equally spaced probes are applied to the specimen in a line. The two outer probes induce the current to the specimen and the two inner electrodes measure the resulting potential drop. The probes are all applied to the same surface of the specimen and the method is consequently suitable for measuring the resistivity of bulk concrete in situ.

The resistivity is given by:

$$\rho=2 \pi a \frac{V}{I}$$

V is the voltage measured between the inner two probes (measured in volts, V)
I is the current injected in the two outer probes (measured in amps, A)
a is the equal distance of the probes (measured in metres, m).

=== Rebar ===
The presence of rebars disturbs electrical resistivity measurement as they conduct current much better than the surrounding concrete. This is particularly the case when the concrete cover depth is less than 30 mm. In order to minimize the effect, placing the electrodes above a rebar is usually avoided, or if unavoidable, then they are placed perpendicular to the rebar.

However, measurement of the resistance between a rebar and a single probe at the concrete surface is sometimes done in conjunction with electrochemical measurements. Resistivity strongly affects corrosion rates and electrochemical measurements require an electrical connection to the rebar. It is convenient to make a resistance measurement with the same connection.

The resistivity is given by:

$$\rho = 2RD$$

R is the measured resistance,
D is the diameter of the surface probe.

== Relation to corrosion ==
Corrosion is an electro-chemical process. The rate of flow of the ions between the anode and cathode areas, and therefore the rate at which corrosion can occur, is affected by the resistivity of the concrete. To measure the electrical resistivity of the concrete a current is applied to the two outer probes and the potential difference is measured between the two inner probes. Empirical tests have arrived at the following threshold values which can be used to determine the likelihood of corrosion.

• When ρ ≥ 120 Ω-m	corrosion is unlikely
• When ρ = 80 to 120 Ω-m	corrosion is possible
• When ρ ≤ 80 Ω-m	corrosion is fairly certain

These values have to be used cautiously as there is strong evidence that chloride diffusion and surface electrical resistivity is dependent on other factors such as mix composition and age. The electrical resistivity of the concrete cover layer decreases due to:

- Increasing concrete water content
- Increasing concrete porosity
- Increasing temperature
- Increasing chloride content
- Decreasing carbonatation depth

When the electrical resistivity of the concrete is low, the rate of corrosion increases. When the electrical resistivity is high, e.g. in case of dry and carbonated concrete, the rate of corrosion decreases.

== See also ==
- Concrete degradation
- Cover meter
- Impedance spectroscopy
- Induced polarization (IP)
