= Dielectric spectroscopy =

Electromagnetic measurement technique

A dielectric permittivity spectrum over a wide range of frequencies. The real and imaginary parts of permittivity are shown, and various processes are depicted: ionic and dipolar relaxation, and atomic and electronic resonances at higher energies.

Dielectric spectroscopy (which falls in a subcategory of the impedance spectroscopy) measures the dielectric properties of a medium as a function of frequency. It is based on the interaction of an external field with the electric dipole moment of the sample, often expressed by permittivity.

It is also an experimental method of characterizing electrochemical systems. This technique measures the impedance of a system over a range of frequencies, and therefore the frequency response of the system, including the energy storage and dissipation properties, is revealed. Often, data obtained by electrochemical impedance spectroscopy (EIS) is expressed graphically in a Bode plot or a Nyquist plot.

Impedance is the opposition to the flow of alternating current (AC) in a complex system. A passive complex electrical system comprises both energy dissipater (resistor) and energy storage (capacitor) elements. If the system is purely resistive, then the opposition to AC or direct current (DC) is simply resistance. Materials or systems exhibiting multiple phases (such as composites or heterogeneous materials) commonly show a universal dielectric response, whereby dielectric spectroscopy reveals a power law relationship between the impedance (or the inverse term, admittance) and the frequency, ω, of the applied AC field.

Almost any physico-chemical system, such as electrochemical cells, mass-beam oscillators, and even biological tissue possesses energy storage and dissipation properties. EIS examines them.

This technique has grown tremendously in stature over the past few years and is now being widely employed in a wide variety of scientific fields such as fuel cell testing, biomolecular interaction, and microstructural characterization. Often, EIS reveals information about the reaction mechanism of an electrochemical process: different reaction steps will dominate at certain frequencies, and the frequency response shown by EIS can help identify the rate limiting step.

== Dielectric mechanisms ==
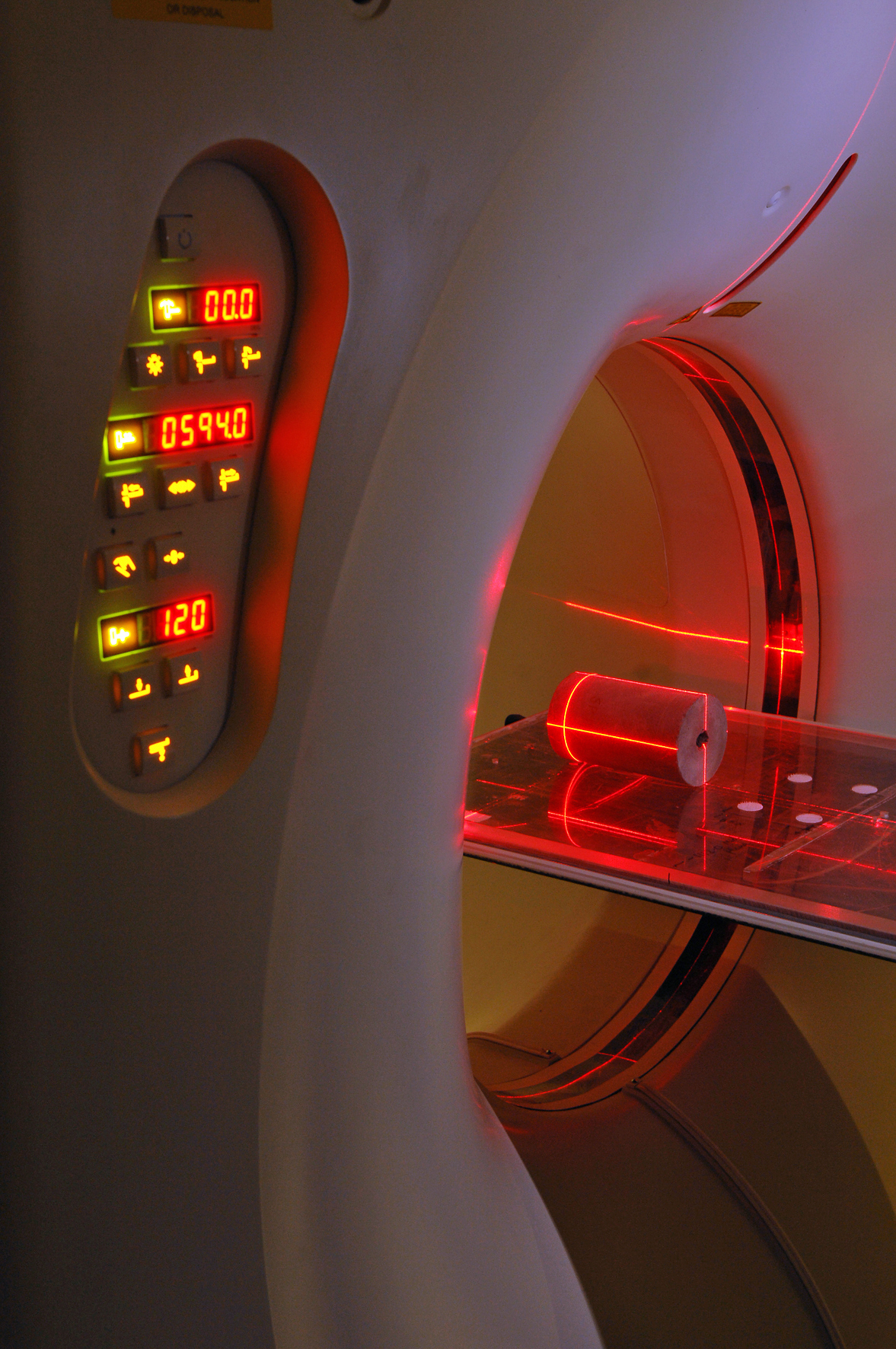
Dielectrics spectroscopy machine

There are a number of different dielectric mechanisms, connected to the way a studied medium reacts to the applied field (see the figure illustration). Each dielectric mechanism is centered around its characteristic frequency, which is the reciprocal of the characteristic time of the process. In general, dielectric mechanisms can be divided into relaxation and resonance processes. The most common, starting from high frequencies, are:

=== Electronic polarization ===
This resonant process occurs in a neutral atom when the electric field displaces the electron density relative to the nucleus it surrounds.

This displacement occurs due to the equilibrium between restoration and electric forces. Electronic polarization may be understood by assuming an atom as a point nucleus surrounded by spherical electron cloud of uniform charge density.

=== Atomic polarization ===
Atomic polarization is observed when the nucleus of the atom reorients in response to the electric field. This is a resonant process. Atomic polarization is intrinsic to the nature of the atom and is a consequence of an applied field. Electronic polarization refers to the electron density and is a consequence of an applied field. Atomic polarization is usually small compared to electronic polarization.

=== Dipole relaxation ===
This originates from permanent and induced dipoles aligning to an electric field. Their orientation polarisation is disturbed by thermal noise (which mis-aligns the dipole vectors from the direction of the field), and the time needed for dipoles to relax is determined by the local viscosity. These two facts make dipole relaxation heavily dependent on temperature, pressure, and chemical surrounding.

=== Ionic relaxation ===
Ionic relaxation comprises ionic conductivity and interfacial and space charge relaxation. Ionic conductivity predominates at low frequencies and introduces only losses to the system. Interfacial relaxation occurs when charge carriers are trapped at interfaces of heterogeneous systems. A related effect is Maxwell-Wagner-Sillars polarization, where charge carriers blocked at inner dielectric boundary layers (on the mesoscopic scale) or external electrodes (on a macroscopic scale) lead to a separation of charges. The charges may be separated by a considerable distance and therefore make contributions to the dielectric loss that are orders of magnitude larger than the response due to molecular fluctuations.

=== Dielectric relaxation ===
Dielectric relaxation as a whole is the result of the movement of dipoles (dipole relaxation) and electric charges (ionic relaxation) due to an applied alternating field, and is usually observed in the frequency range 10^{2}-10^{10} Hz. Relaxation mechanisms are relatively slow compared to resonant electronic transitions or molecular vibrations, which usually have frequencies above 10^{12} Hz.

== Principles ==
=== Steady-state ===
For a redox reaction R $\leftrightarrow$ O + e, without mass-transfer limitation, the relationship between the current density and the electrode overpotential is given by the Butler–Volmer equation:
$$j_{\text{t}} = j_0 \left(\exp(\alpha_{\text{o}} \,f\, \eta)-\exp(-\alpha_{\text{r}}\,f\,\eta)\right)$$
with
$$\eta = E - E_{\text{eq}} ,\;f=F/(R\,T),\;\alpha_{\text{o}} + \alpha_{\text{r}} = 1.$$
$j_0$ is the exchange current density and $\alpha_{\text{o}}$ and $\alpha_{\text{r}}$ are the symmetry factors.

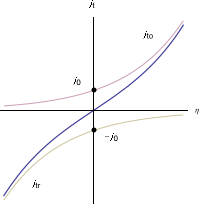
Fig. 1: Steady-state current density vs. overpotential for a redox reaction

The curve $j_{\text{t}}$ vs. $E$ is not a straight line (Fig. 1), therefore a redox reaction is not a linear system.

=== Dynamic behavior ===
==== Faradaic impedance ====
In an electrochemical cell the faradaic impedance of an electrolyte-electrode interface is the joint electrical resistance and capacitance at that interface.

Let us suppose that the Butler-Volmer relationship correctly describes the dynamic behavior of the redox reaction:
$$j_{\text{t}}(t) = j_{\text{t}}(\eta(t)) = j_0 \left(\exp(\alpha_{\text{o}}\,f\, \eta(t))-\exp(-\alpha_{\text{r}}\,f\,\eta(t))\right)$$

Dynamic behavior of the redox reaction is characterized by the so-called charge transfer resistance $R_{\text{ct}}$ defined by:
$$R_{\text{ct}} = \frac{1}{\partial j_{\text{t}} / \partial \eta } = \frac{1}{f\, j_0\, \left(\alpha_{\text{o}} \exp(\alpha_{\text{o}}\,f\, \eta)+\alpha_{\text{r}} \exp(-\alpha_{\text{r}} \, f\, \eta) \right)}$$

The value of the charge transfer resistance changes with the overpotential. For this simplest example the faradaic impedance is reduced to a resistance. It is worthwhile to notice that:
$$R_{\text{ct}} = \frac{1}{f\,j_0}$$
for $\eta = 0$.

==== Double-layer capacitance ====
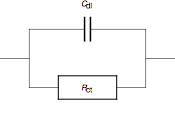
Fig. 2: Equivalent circuit for a redoxin reaction without mass-transfer limitation

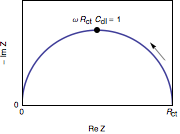
Fig. 3: Electrochemists Nyquist diagram of a RC parallel circuit. The arrow indicates increasing angular frequencies.

An electrode $|$ electrolyte interface behaves like a capacitance called electrochemical double-layer capacitance $C_{\text{dl}}$. The equivalent circuit for the redox reaction in Fig. 2 includes the double-layer capacitance $C_{\text{dl}}$ as well as the charge transfer resistance $R_{\text{ct}}$. Another analog circuit commonly used to model the electrochemical double-layer is called a constant phase element.

The electrical impedance of this circuit is easily obtained remembering the impedance of a capacitance which is given by:
$$Z_{\text{dl}}(\omega) = \frac{1}{i \omega C_{\text{dl}}}$$
where $\omega$ is the angular frequency of a sinusoidal signal (rad/s), and $i^2 = -1$.

It is obtained:
$$Z(\omega) = \frac{R_{\text{t}}}{1 + R_{\text{t}} C_{\text{dl}} i \omega}$$

Nyquist diagram of the impedance of the circuit shown in Fig. 3 is a semicircle with a diameter $R_{\text{t}}$ and an angular frequency at the apex equal to $1/(R_{\text{t}}\,C_{\text{dc}})$ (Fig. 3). Other representations such as Bode plots can be used instead.

==== Ohmic resistance ====
The ohmic resistance $R_\Omega$ appears in series with the electrode impedance of the reaction and the Nyquist diagram is translated to the right.

=== Universal dielectric response ===
Under AC conditions with varying frequency ω, heterogeneous systems and composite materials exhibit a universal dielectric response, in which overall admittance exhibits a region of power law scaling with frequency. $Y \propto \omega^{\alpha}$.

== Measurement of the impedance parameters ==
Plotting the Nyquist diagram with a potentiostat and an impedance analyzer, most often included in modern potentiostats, allows the user to determine charge transfer resistance, double-layer capacitance and ohmic resistance. The exchange current density $j_0$ can be easily determined measuring the impedance of a redox reaction for $\eta=0$.

Nyquist diagrams are made of several arcs for reactions more complex than redox reactions and with mass-transfer limitations.

== Applications ==
Electrochemical impedance spectroscopy is used in a wide range of applications.

In the paint and coatings industry, it is a useful tool to investigate the quality of coatings and to detect the presence of corrosion.

It is used in many biosensor systems as a label-free technique to measure bacterial concentration and to detect dangerous pathogens such as Escherichia coli O157:H7 and Salmonella, and yeast cells.

Electrochemical impedance spectroscopy is also used to analyze and characterize different food products. Some examples are the assessment of food–package interactions, the analysis of milk composition, the characterization and the determination of the freezing end-point of ice-cream mixes, the measure of meat ageing, the investigation of ripeness and quality in fruits and the determination of free acidity in olive oil.

In the field of human health monitoring is better known as bioelectrical impedance analysis (BIA) and is used to estimate body composition as well as different parameters such as total body water and free fat mass.

Electrochemical impedance spectroscopy can be used to obtain the frequency response of batteries and electrocatalytic systems at relatively high temperatures.

Biomedical sensors working in the microwave range relies on dielectric spectroscopy to detect changes in the dielectric properties over a frequency range, such as non-invasive continuous blood glucose monitoring. The IFAC database can be used as a resource to get the dielectric properties for human body tissues.

For heterogenous mixtures like suspensions impedance spectroscopy can be used to monitor the particle sedimentation process.

== See also ==
- Debye relaxation
- Dielectric absorption, ultra-low frequency changes
- Dielectric loss
- Electrochemistry
- Ellipsometry
- Green–Kubo relations
- Induced polarization (IP)
- Kramers–Kronig relations
- Linear response function
- Potentiostat
- Spectral induced polarisation (SIP)
