= Electrode array =

The Wenner electrode array consists of a line of four equally spaced electrodes. Current is injected through the outer electrodes and potential is measured between the inner electrodes.

An electrode array is a configuration of electrodes used for measuring either an electric current or voltage. Some electrode arrays can operate in a bidirectional fashion, in that they can also be used to provide a stimulating pattern of electric current or voltage.

Common arrays include:

- Schlumberger (Wenner)
- Wenner alpha
- Wenner beta
- Wenner gamma
- Pole-pole
- Dipole-dipole
- Pole-dipole
- Equatorial dipole-dipole

== Resistivity ==
Resistivity measurement of bulk materials is a frequent application of electrode arrays. The figure shows a Wenner array, one of the possible ways of achieving this. Injecting the current through electrodes separate from those being used for measurement of potential has the advantage of eliminating any inaccuracies caused by the injecting circuit resistance, particularly the contact resistance between the probe and the surface, which can be high. Assuming the material is homogenous, the resistivity in the Wenner array is given by:

$$\rho=2 \pi a \frac {V}{I}$$

where $a$ is the distance between probes.

Electrode arrays are widely used to measure resistivity in geophysics applications. It is also used in the semiconductor industry to measure the bulk resistivity of silicon wafers, which in turn can be taken as a measure of the doping that has been applied to the wafer, before further manufacturing processes are undertaken.

== See also ==
- Four-terminal sensing
- Multielectrode array
- Electrical resistivity measurement of concrete
- Detoxification foot baths
