= Kohlrausch =

Kohlrausch may refer to:

- Eduard Kohlrausch (1874–1948), Jurist, Rector of Humboldt University 1932–33
- Ernst Kohlrausch (1850–1923), Sports researcher and film pioneer
- Friedrich Wilhelm Georg Kohlrausch (1840–1910), German physicist noted for research on conductivity of electrolyte solutions, son of Rudolf
- Heinrich Friedrich Theodor Kohlrausch (1780–1867), director of the Royal Hanover General School
- Henriette Kohlrausch (1781–1842), German botanist and naturalist
- Karl Wilhelm Friedrich Kohlrausch (1884–1953), Austrian physicist
- Otto Kohlrausch (1811–1854), German surgeon, son of Heinrich
- Rudolf Kohlrausch (1809–1858), German physicist noted for research on electromagnetism and electromagnetic relaxation phenomena, son of Heinrich
