= Charles Fox =

Charles or Charlie Fox may refer to:

== Artists and entertainers ==
- Charles Fox (engraver) (1794–1849), English engraver
- Charles Fox (composer) (born 1940), American film and television composer
- Charles Fox (jazz critic) (1921–1991), British jazz critic
- Irving Resnikoff, alias "Charles J. Fox" (1897–1988), Russian-born American portrait painter

== Sportspeople ==
- Charlie Fox (baseball) (Charles Francis Fox, 1921–2004), American baseball manager, scout, coach, and player
- Chas Fox (born 1963), American football player
- Charles Fox (cricketer) (1858–1901), English cricketer
- Charlie Fox (footballer) (born 1998), English footballer
- Charlie Fox (rugby union) (1898–1984), Australian rugby union player
- Charles Fox (swimmer) (born 1948), Zambian Olympic swimmer

== Politicians ==
- Charles Fox (politician, born 1660), British politician, Paymaster of the Forces
- Charles James Fox (1749–1806), British politician
- Charles L. Fox (1854–1927), American artist, philanthropist and socialist from Maine
- Charles Fox (socialist activist) (1861–1939), British socialist activist and dentist
- Charles Fox (Irish politician) (c. 1791–1862), member of parliament for Longford

== Others ==
- Charles Fox (engineer, born 1810) (1810–1874), British civil and railway engineer who built the Crystal Palace
- Douglas Fox (engineer) (Charles Douglas Fox, 1840–1921), British civil engineer
- Charles Fox (mathematician) (1897–1977), British-born mathematician
- Charles Fox (missionary) (1878–1977), English ethnographer and missionary
- Charles Eli Fox (1879–1926), American architect, partner in the Chicago firm of Marshall and Fox
- Charles Fox (scientist) (1797–1878), British scientist
- Charles James Fox (editor) (1827–1903), newspaper editor and owner in Australia
- Charles Masson Fox (1866–1935), Cornish businessman and chess player
- Chappie Fox (Charles Philip Fox, 1913–2003), circus historian and philanthropist
- Charles R. Fox (1912–2006), American major general
- Charles N. Fox (1829–1903), California Supreme Court associate justice
- Charles Richard Fox (1796–1873), illegitimate son of Henry Richard Vassall-Fox, 3rd Baron Holland
- Charles Vincent Fox (1877–1928), British army officer and rower
- Charley Fox (Charles W. Fox, 1920–2008), Canadian Air Force officer in World War II
- Sir Charles Edmund Fox (1854–1918), British barrister and judge in British Burma

== See also ==
- Charlie Foxx (1939–1998), American musician
- Charles Foxe (died 1590), English politician
