= Tilak Raj Prabhakar =

Indian mathematician

- Born: Boumerdès, Algeria
- Died: 1982
- Education: Benaras Hindu University (BA, MA); University of Delhi (PhD, 1970)
- Known for: Prabhakar function
- Scientific career
- Fields: Mathematics
- Workplaces: S.D. College; Multani Mal Modi College; Ramjas College; National Institute of Electricity and Electronics
- Thesis: Integral Equations and Special Functions (1970)

Tilak Raj Prabhakar was an Indian mathematician specializing in special functions and integral equations. In a paper published in 1971, he introduced a three-parameter extension of the Mittag-Leffler function. Subsequently, this function was found to have applications in various areas of mathematics like fractional calculus and also in certain areas of physics. The function has since been named "Prabhakar function" in his honor.

== Education ==
Prabhakar received his M.A. and B.A. degrees from the Benaras Hindu University (India) and obtained his PhD. from the University of Delhi in 1970 with his thesis on "Integral Equations and Special Functions".

== Career ==
Initially, he taught at the S.D. College in Muzzaffarnagar. Then he joined the Multani Mal Modi College in Modinagar where he became Head of the Department of Mathematics and later he moved to the Ramjas College of the University of Delhi. He was professor of mathematics at the National Institute of Electricity and Electronics in Boomerdès, Algeria when he died in 1982.

== See also ==
- Prabhakar function
