= Friedrich Kohlrausch =

Friedrich Kohlrausch may refer to:

- Friedrich Kohlrausch (physicist) (1840–1910), German physicist
- Friedrich Kohlrausch (educator) (1780-1867), German educator and historian
