= Havriliak–Negami relaxation =

Model in electromagnetism

The Havriliak–Negami relaxation is an empirical modification of the Debye relaxation model in electromagnetism. Unlike the Debye model, the Havriliak–Negami relaxation accounts for the asymmetry and broadness of the dielectric dispersion curve. The model was first used to describe the dielectric relaxation of some polymers, by adding two exponential parameters to the Debye equation:

$$\hat{\varepsilon}(\omega) = \varepsilon_{\infty} + \frac{\Delta\varepsilon}{(1+(i\omega\tau)^{\alpha})^{\beta}},$$

where $\varepsilon_{\infty}$ is the permittivity at the high frequency limit, $\Delta\varepsilon = \varepsilon_{s}-\varepsilon_{\infty}$ where $\varepsilon_{s}$ is the static, low frequency permittivity, and $\tau$ is the characteristic relaxation time of the medium. The exponents $\alpha$ and $\beta$ describe the asymmetry and broadness of the corresponding spectra.

The relation is named after Stephen Havriliak Jr. and Sinichi Negami, who published in 1967.

Depending on application, the Fourier transform of the stretched exponential function can be a viable alternative that has one parameter less.

For $\beta = 1$ the Havriliak–Negami equation reduces to the Cole–Cole equation, for $\alpha=1$ to the Cole–Davidson equation.

== Mathematical properties ==
=== Real and imaginary parts ===
The storage part $\varepsilon'$ and the loss part $\varepsilon''$ of the permittivity (here: $\hat{\varepsilon}(\omega) = \varepsilon'(\omega) - i \varepsilon''(\omega)$ with $(\pm i)^2=-1$) can be calculated as

$$\varepsilon'(\omega) = \varepsilon_{\infty} + \Delta\varepsilon\left( 1 + 2 (\omega\tau)^\alpha \cos (\pi\alpha/2) + (\omega\tau)^{2\alpha} \right)^{-\beta/2} \cos (\beta\phi)$$

and

$$\varepsilon''(\omega) = \Delta\varepsilon\left( 1 + 2 (\omega\tau)^\alpha \cos (\pi\alpha/2) + (\omega\tau)^{2\alpha} \right)^{-\beta/2} \sin (\beta\phi)$$

with

$$\phi = \arctan \left( { (\omega\tau)^\alpha \sin(\pi\alpha/2) \over
1 + (\omega\tau)^\alpha \cos(\pi\alpha/2) } \right)$$

=== Loss peak ===
The maximum of the loss part lies at

$$\omega_{\rm max} =
\left( { \sin \left( { \pi\alpha \over 2 ( \beta +1 ) } \right) \over
\sin \left( { \pi\alpha\beta \over 2 ( \beta +1 ) } \right) } \right) ^ {1/\alpha}
\tau^{-1}$$

=== Superposition of Lorentzians ===
The Havriliak–Negami relaxation can be expressed as a superposition of individual Debye relaxations

$${ \hat{\varepsilon}(\omega) - \epsilon_\infty \over \Delta\varepsilon } = \int_{-\infty}^\infty
{ 1 \over 1 + i \omega \tau_D } g( \ln \tau_D ) d \ln \tau_D$$

with the real valued distribution function

$$g ( \ln \tau_D ) = { 1 \over \pi }
{ ( \tau_D / \tau )^{\alpha\beta} \sin (\beta\theta) \over
( ( \tau_D / \tau )^{2\alpha} + 2 ( \tau_D / \tau )^{\alpha} \cos (\pi\alpha) + 1 )^{\beta/2} }$$

where

$$\theta = \arctan \left( { \sin (\pi\alpha) \over ( \tau_D / \tau )^{\alpha} + \cos (\pi\alpha) } \right)$$

if the argument of the arctangent is positive, else

$$\theta = \arctan \left( { \sin (\pi\alpha) \over ( \tau_D / \tau )^{\alpha} + \cos (\pi\alpha) } \right) + \pi$$

Noteworthy, $g ( \ln \tau )$ becomes imaginary valued for

$${ \hat{\varepsilon}(\omega) - \epsilon_\infty \over \Delta\varepsilon } = { (i \omega \tau)^{\alpha \beta} \over (1 + (i \omega \tau)^{\alpha})^{\beta} }$$

and complex valued for

$${ \hat{\varepsilon}(\omega) - \epsilon_\infty \over \Delta\varepsilon } = { 1 \over (1 - (\omega \tau)^{2\alpha})^{\beta} }$$

=== Logarithmic moments ===
The first logarithmic moment of this distribution, the average logarithmic relaxation time is

$$\langle \ln\tau_D \rangle = \ln\tau + { \Psi(\beta) + {\rm Eu} \over \alpha }$$

where $\Psi$ is the digamma function and ${\rm Eu}$ the Euler constant.

=== Inverse Fourier transform ===
The inverse Fourier transform of the Havriliak-Negami function (the corresponding time-domain relaxation function) can be numerically calculated. It can be shown that the series expansions involved are special cases of the Fox–Wright function. In particular, in the time-domain the corresponding of $\hat{\varepsilon}(\omega)$ can be represented as

$$X(t) = \varepsilon_{\infty} \delta(t) + \frac{\Delta\varepsilon}{\tau} \left( \frac{t}{\tau}\right)^{\alpha\beta-1} E_{\alpha,\alpha\beta}^{\beta}(-(t/\tau)^{\alpha}) ,$$

where $\delta(t)$ is the Dirac delta function and

$$E_{\alpha,\beta}^{\gamma}(z) = \frac{1}{\Gamma(\gamma)} \sum_{k=0}^{\infty} \frac{\Gamma(\gamma+k) z^{k}}{k! \Gamma(\alpha k + \beta)}$$

is a special instance of the Fox–Wright function and, precisely, it is the three parameters Mittag-Leffler function also known as the Prabhakar function. The function $E_{\alpha,\beta}^{\gamma}(z)$ can be numerically evaluated, for instance, by means of a Matlab code .

== See also ==
- Debye relaxation
- Cole–Cole equation
- Cole–Davidson equation
- Curie–von Schweidler law
- Dielectric spectroscopy
- Dipole
