= Cäcilia Böhm-Wendt =

Austrian physicist

- Born: Cäcilia Wendt; 4 May 1875; Troppau, Silesia
- Education: University of Vienna (1900)
- Scientific career
- Fields: Physics
- Workplaces: University of Vienna

Cäcilia Böhm-Wendt (née Wendt; born 4 May 1875) was an Austrian physicist, who conducted research on radioactivity at the University of Vienna. She published her first paper in 1899, on rational values of trigonometric functions. She earned her doctoral degree in 1900, and went on to conduct research with Egon von Schweidler at the University of Vienna. She was one of only two Austrian women to publish in physics at that time.

== Early life and education ==
She was born Cäcilia Wendt on 4 May 1875 in Troppau, Silesia. Her father was Dr F. M. Wendt, and it is thought he was a teacher. She studied at the University of Vienna from 1896 to 1900, where she published work on rational values of trigonometric functions, receiving a doctoral degree for research on special functions important in mathematical physics.

== Career ==
In 1900, she became the first woman to hold the position of probationary teacher at Vienna's gymnasium for young women (gymnasiale Mädchenschule). She worked at the University of Vienna's Physical Institute, investigating how the radiation produced by radium created electrical conductivity in dielectric materials (petroleum ether and vaseline oil). She then determined the mobility of the resulting ions. At the institute, she was a research collaborator with its director, Egon von Schweidler, who was investigating the properties of new elements. They published their work together in 1909.

In 1909, she and Maria Sadzewicz were the only two women in Austria to publish physics papers; at this time, only about 1% of physicists were women.

== Selected publications ==
- Wendt, Cäcilie (1899). "Note über die Kreisfunctionen". Monatshefte für Mathematik und Physik (in German). 10 (1): 97–100. doi:10.1007/BF01695049. ISSN 0026-9255. S2CID 121649061.
- Wendt, Cäcilie (1900). "Eine Verallgemeinerung des Additionstheoremes der Bessel'schen Functionen erster Art". Monatshefte für Mathematik und Physik (in German). 11 (1): 125–131. doi:10.1007/BF01832513. ISSN 0026-9255. S2CID 120601933.
- Böhm-Wendt, Cäcilia; Schweidler, Egon (1909). "Über die spezifische Geschwindigkeit der Ionen in flüssigen Dielektrikas". Physikalische Zeitschrift. 10: 379–382.
