= General Fox =

General Fox may refer to:

- Alonzo Patrick Fox (1895–1984), U.S. Army lieutenant general
- Charles R. Fox (1912–2006), West Virginia National Guard major general
- Charles Richard Fox (1796–1873), British Army general
- David G. Fox (fl. 1980s–2010s), U.S. Army brigadier general
- Henry Edward Fox (1755–1811), British Army general
- Jim Fox (Canadian Army officer) (fl. 1980s), Canadian Forces lieutenant general
- Yehuda Fox (born 1969), Israel Defense Forces major general

== See also ==
- William Fox-Pitt (British Army officer) (1896–1988), British Army major general
- Attorney General Fox (disambiguation)
