= Saturable absorption =

Nonlinear optical effect

Saturable absorption is a property of materials where the absorption of light decreases with increasing light intensity. Most materials show some saturable absorption, but often only at very high optical intensities (close to the optical damage). At sufficiently high incident light intensity, the ground state of a saturable absorber material is excited into an upper energy state at such a rate that there is insufficient time for it to decay back to the ground state before the ground state becomes depleted, causing the absorption to saturate. The key parameters for a saturable absorber are its wavelength range (where in the electromagnetic spectrum it absorbs), its dynamic response (how fast it recovers), and its saturation intensity and fluence (at what intensity or pulse energy it saturates).

Saturable absorber materials are useful in laser cavities. For instance, they are commonly used for passive Q-switching.

== Phenomenology ==
Within the simple model of saturated absorption, the relaxation rate of excitations does not depend on the intensity. Then, for the continuous-wave (cw) operation, the absorption rate (or simply absorption) $A$ is determined by intensity $I$:

$$(1)~~ ~~ A= \frac{\alpha}{1+I/I_0}$$

where $\alpha$ is linear absorption, and $I_0$ is saturation intensity. These parameters are related with the concentration $N$ of the active centers in the medium, the effective cross-sections $\sigma$ and the lifetime $\tau$ of the excitations.

== Relation with Wright omega function ==
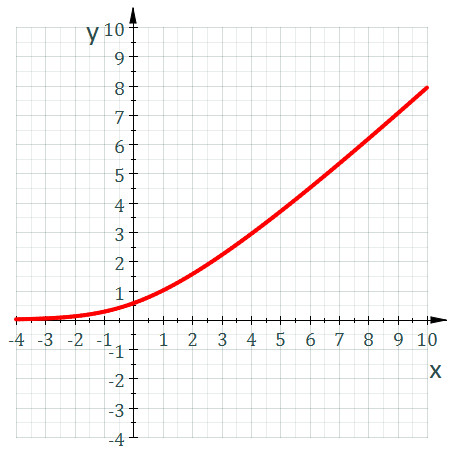
Wright omega function

In the simplest geometry, when the rays of the absorbing light are parallel, the intensity can be described with the Beer–Lambert law,

$$(2)~~ ~~ \frac{\mathrm{d} I}{\mathrm{d}z}=-AI$$

where $z$ is coordinate in the direction of propagation. Substitution of (1) into (2) gives the equation

$$(3)~~ ~~ \frac{\mathrm{d}I}{\mathrm{d}z}=-\frac{\alpha~ I}{1+I/I_0}$$

With the dimensionless variables $u=I/I_0$, $t=\alpha z$, equation (3) can be rewritten as

$$(4)~~ ~~ \frac{\mathrm{d}u}{\mathrm{d}t}=\frac{-u}{1+u}$$

The solution can be expressed in terms of the Wright omega function $\omega$:

$$(5)~~ ~~ u = \omega(-t)$$

== Relation with Lambert W function ==
The solution can be expressed also through the related Lambert W function. Let $u=V\big(-\mathrm{e}^t\big)$. Then

$$(6)~~ ~~ -\mathrm{e}^t V'\big(-\mathrm{e}^t\big)= - \frac{V\big(-\mathrm{e}^t\big)}{1+V\big(-\mathrm{e}^t\big)}$$

With new independent variable $p=-\mathrm{e}^t$, Equation (6) leads to the equation

$$(7)~~ ~~ V'(p)=\frac{V(p)}{p\cdot (1+V(p))}$$

The formal solution can be written

$$(8)~~ ~~ V(p)=W(p-p_0)$$

where $p_0$ is constant, but the equation $V(p_0)=0$ may correspond to the non-physical value of intensity (intensity zero) or to the unusual branch of the Lambert W function.

== Saturation fluence ==
For pulsed operation, in the limiting case of short pulses, absorption can be expressed through the fluence

$$(9)~~ ~~ F=\int_{0}^t I(t) \mathrm{d}t$$

where time $t$ should be small compared to the relaxation time of the medium; it is assumed that the intensity is zero at $t<0$. Then, the saturable absorption can be written as follows:

$$(10)~~ ~~ A=\frac{\alpha}{1+F/F_0}$$

where saturation fluence $F_0$ is constant.

In the intermediate case (neither continuous, nor short pulse operation), the rate equations for excitation and relaxation in the optical medium must be considered together.

Saturation fluence is one of the factors that determine threshold in the gain media and limits the storage of energy in a pulsed disk laser.

== Mechanisms and examples ==
Absorption saturation, which results in decreased absorption at high incident light intensity, competes with other mechanisms (for example, increase in temperature, formation of color centers, etc.), which result in increased absorption. In particular, saturable absorption is only one of several mechanisms that produce self-pulsation in lasers, especially in semiconductor lasers.

One atom thick layer of carbon, graphene, can be seen with the naked eye because it absorbs approximately 2.3% of white light, which is π times fine-structure constant. The saturable absorption response of graphene is wavelength independent from UV to IR, mid-IR and even to THz frequencies. In rolled-up graphene sheets (carbon nanotubes), saturable absorption is dependent on diameter and chirality.

== Microwave and terahertz saturable absorption ==
Saturable absorption can even take place at the microwave and terahertz band (corresponding to a wavelength from 30 μm to 300 μm). Some materials, for example graphene, with very weak energy band gap (several meV), could absorb photons at Microwave and Terahertz band due to its interband absorption. In one report, microwave absorbance of graphene always decreases with increasing the power and reaches at a constant level for power larger than a threshold value. The microwave saturable absorption in graphene is almost independent of the incident frequency, which demonstrates that graphene may have important applications in graphene microwave photonics devices such as: microwave saturable absorber, modulator, polarizer, microwave signal processing, broad-band wireless access networks, sensor networks, radar, satellite communications, and so on.

== Saturable X-ray absorption ==
Saturable absorption has been demonstrated for X-rays. In one study, a thin 50 nanometres (2.0×10^{−6} in) foil of aluminium was irradiated with soft X-ray laser radiation (wavelength 13.5 nm). The short laser pulse knocked out core L-shell electrons without breaking the crystalline structure of the metal, making it transparent to soft X-rays of the same wavelength for about 40 femtoseconds.

== See also ==
- Two-photon absorption
