= Stretched exponential function =

Mathematical function common in physics

Figure 1. Plot of f_{β}(t) = e^{−t^{β}} for varying values of β, with stretched exponentials (β < 1) in reddish colors, compressed exponentials (β > 1) in green and blue colors, and the standard exponential function in yellow. The degenerate cases β → 0 and β → +∞ are marked in dotted lines.

The stretched exponential function
$$f_\beta (t) = e^{ -t^\beta }$$
is obtained by inserting a fractional power law into the exponential function. In most applications, it is meaningful only for arguments t between 0 and +∞. With β = 1, the usual exponential function is recovered. With a stretching exponent β between 0 and 1, the graph of log f versus t is characteristically stretched, hence the name of the function. The compressed exponential function (with β > 1) has less practical importance, with the notable exceptions of β = 2, which gives the normal distribution, and of compressed exponential relaxation in the dynamics of amorphous solids.

In mathematics, the stretched exponential is also known as the complementary cumulative Weibull distribution. The stretched exponential is also the characteristic function, basically the Fourier transform, of the Lévy symmetric alpha-stable distribution.

In physics, the stretched exponential function is often used as a phenomenological description of relaxation in disordered systems. It was first introduced by Rudolf Kohlrausch in 1854 to describe the discharge of a capacitor; thus it is also known as the Kohlrausch function. In 1970, G. Williams and D.C. Watts used the Fourier transform of the stretched exponential to describe dielectric spectra of polymers; in this context, the stretched exponential or its Fourier transform are also called the Kohlrausch–Williams–Watts (KWW) function. The Kohlrausch–Williams–Watts (KWW) function corresponds to the time domain charge response of the main dielectric models, such as the Cole–Cole equation, the Cole–Davidson equation, and the Havriliak–Negami relaxation, for small time arguments.

In phenomenological applications, it is often not clear whether the stretched exponential function should be used to describe the differential or the integral distribution function—or neither. In each case, one gets the same asymptotic decay, but a different power law prefactor, which makes fits more ambiguous than for simple exponentials. In a few cases, it can be shown that the asymptotic decay is a stretched exponential, but the prefactor is usually an unrelated power.

== Mathematical properties ==
=== Moments ===
Following the usual physical interpretation, we interpret the function argument t as time, and f_{β}(t) is the differential distribution. The area under the curve can thus be interpreted as a mean relaxation time. One finds
$$\langle\tau\rangle \equiv \int_0^\infty dt\, e^{-(t/\tau_K)^\beta} = {\tau_K  \over \beta } \Gamma {\left( \frac 1 \beta \right)}$$
where Γ is the gamma function. For exponential decay, ⟨τ⟩ = τ_{K} is recovered.

The higher moments of the stretched exponential function are
$$\langle\tau^n\rangle \equiv \int_0^\infty dt\, t^{n-1}\, e^{-(t/\tau_K)^\beta} = {{\tau_K}^n  \over \beta }\Gamma {\left(\frac n \beta \right)}.$$

=== Distribution function ===
In physics, attempts have been made to explain stretched exponential behaviour as a linear superposition of simple exponential decays. This requires a nontrivial distribution of relaxation times, ρ(u), which is implicitly defined by
$$e^{-t^\beta} = \int_0^\infty du\,\rho(u)\, e^{-t/u}.$$

Alternatively, a distribution
$$G = u \rho (u)$$
is used.

ρ can be computed from the series expansion:
$$\rho (u ) =  -{ 1 \over \pi u} \sum_{k = 0}^\infty {(-1)^k  \over k!} \sin (\pi \beta k)\Gamma (\beta k + 1) u^{\beta k}$$

For rational values of β, ρ(u) can be calculated in terms of elementary functions. But the expression is in general too complex to be useful except for the case β = 1/2 where
$$G(u) = u \rho(u) = { 1 \over 2\sqrt{\pi}} \sqrt{u} e^{-u/4}$$

Figure 2 shows the same results plotted in both a linear and a log representation. The curves converge to a Dirac delta function peaked at u = 1 as β approaches 1, corresponding to the simple exponential function.

Figure 2. Linear and log-log plots of the stretched exponential distribution function $G$ vs $t/\tau$ for values of the stretching parameter β between 0.1 and 0.9.

The moments of the original function can be expressed as
$$\langle\tau^n\rangle = \Gamma(n) \int_0^\infty d\tau\, t^n \, \rho(\tau).$$

The first logarithmic moment of the distribution of simple-exponential relaxation times is
$$\langle\ln\tau\rangle = \left( 1 - {1 \over \beta} \right) \gamma + \ln \tau_K$$
where γ is the Euler constant.

== Fourier transform ==
To describe results from spectroscopy or inelastic scattering, the sine or cosine Fourier transform of the stretched exponential is needed. It must be calculated either by numeric integration, or from a series expansion. The series here as well as the one for the distribution function are special cases of the Fox–Wright function. For practical purposes, the Fourier transform may be approximated by the Havriliak–Negami function, though nowadays the numeric computation can be done so efficiently that there is no longer any reason not to use the Kohlrausch–Williams–Watts function in the frequency domain.

== History and further applications ==
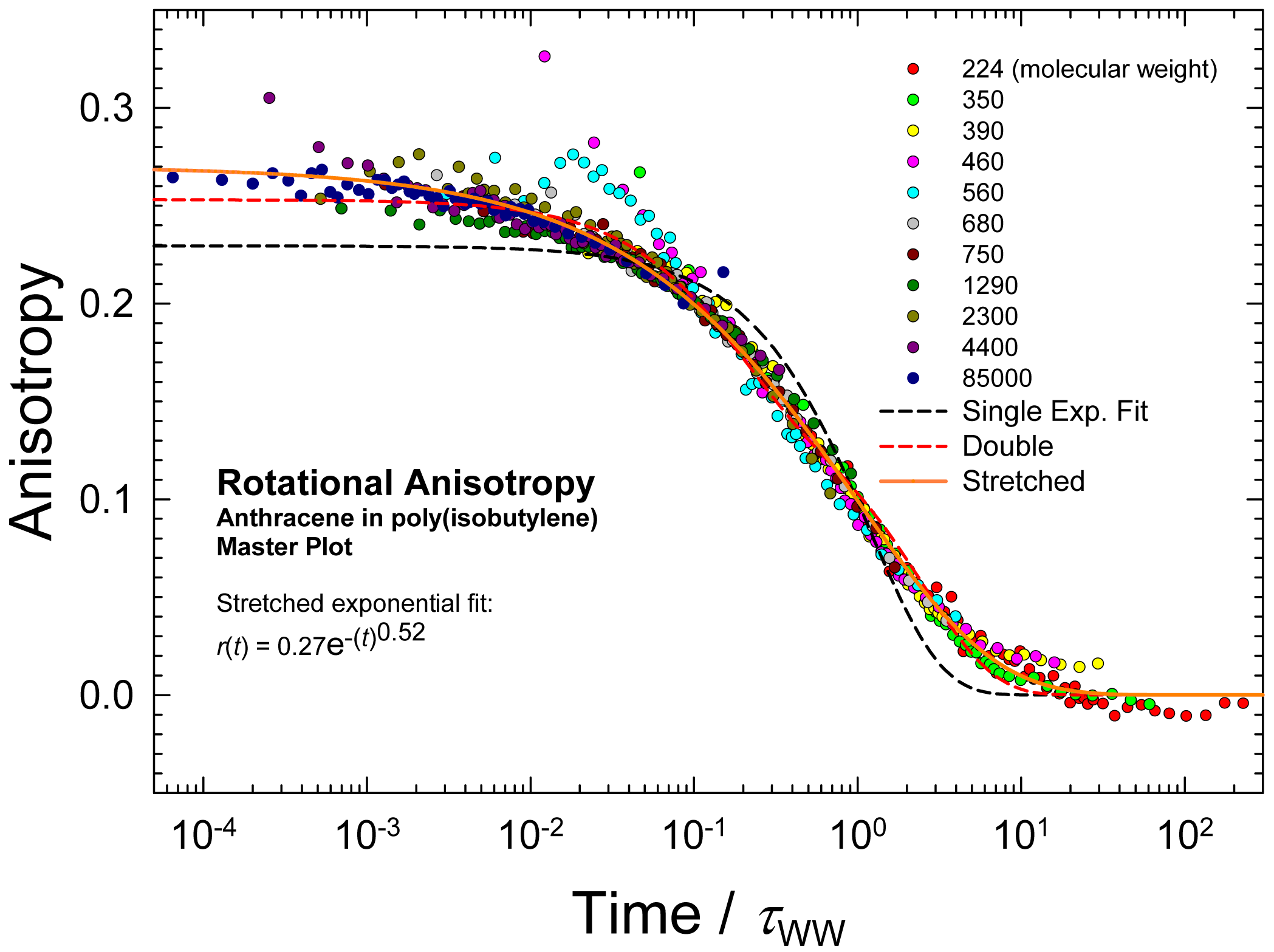
Figure 3. Illustration of a stretched exponential fit (with β=0.52) to an empirical master curve. For comparison, a least squares single and a double exponential fit are also shown. The data are rotational anisotropy of anthracene in polyisobutylene of several molecular masses. The plots have been made to overlap by dividing time (t) by the respective characteristic time constant.

As said in the introduction, the stretched exponential was introduced by the German physicist Rudolf Kohlrausch in 1854 to describe the discharge of a capacitor (Leyden jar) that used glass as dielectric medium. The next documented usage is by Friedrich Kohlrausch, son of Rudolf, to describe torsional relaxation. A. Werner used it in 1907 to describe complex luminescence decays; Theodor Förster in 1949 as the fluorescence decay law of electronic energy donors.

Outside condensed matter physics, the stretched exponential has been used to describe the removal rates of small, stray bodies in the solar system, the diffusion-weighted MRI signal in the brain, and the production from unconventional gas wells.

=== In probability ===
If the integrated distribution is a stretched exponential, the normalized probability density function is given by
$$p(\tau \mid \lambda, \beta)~d\tau = \frac{\lambda}{\Gamma(1 + \beta^{-1})} ~ e^{-(\tau \lambda)^\beta} ~ d\tau$$

Note that confusingly some authors have been known to use the name "stretched exponential" to refer to the Weibull distribution.

=== Modified functions ===
A modified stretched exponential function
$$f_\beta (t) = e^{ -t^{\beta(t)} }$$
with a slowly t-dependent exponent β has been used for biological survival curves.

=== Wireless communications ===
In wireless communications, a scaled version of the stretched exponential function has been shown to appear in the Laplace Transform for the interference power $I$ when the transmitters' locations are modeled as a 2D Poisson Point Process with no exclusion region around the receiver.

The Laplace transform can be written for arbitrary fading distribution as follows:
$$L_I(s) = \exp\left(-\pi \lambda \mathbb{E}{\left[g^\frac{2}{\eta} \right]} \Gamma{\left(1 - \frac{2}{\eta} \right)} s^\frac{2}{\eta}\right) = \exp\left(- t s^\beta \right)$$
where $g$ is the power of the fading, $\eta$ is the path loss exponent, $\lambda$ is the density of the 2D Poisson Point Process, $\Gamma(\cdot)$ is the Gamma function, and $\mathbb{E}[x]$ is the expectation of the variable $x$.

The same reference also shows how to obtain the inverse Laplace Transform for the stretched exponential $\exp\left(-s^\beta \right)$ for higher order integer $\beta = \beta_q \beta_b$ from lower order integers $\beta_a$ and $\beta_b$.

=== Internet streaming ===
The stretched exponential has been used to characterize Internet media accessing patterns, such as YouTube and other stable streaming media sites. The commonly agreed power-law accessing patterns of Web workloads mainly reflect text-based content Web workloads, such as daily updated news sites.
