= Cole–Cole equation =

Relaxation model

Cole-cole plot for water

The Cole–Cole equation is a relaxation model that is often used to describe dielectric relaxation in polymers.

It is given by the equation

$$\varepsilon^*(\omega) = \varepsilon_\infty + \frac{\varepsilon_s - \varepsilon_\infty}{1+(i\omega\tau)^{1 - \alpha}} = \varepsilon_\infty + \frac{\Delta\varepsilon}{1+(i\omega\tau)^{1 - \alpha}}$$

where $\varepsilon^*$ is the complex dielectric constant, $\varepsilon_s$ and $\varepsilon_\infty$ are the "static" and "infinite frequency" dielectric constants, $\omega$ is the angular frequency and $\tau$ is a dielectric relaxation time constant.

The exponent parameter $\alpha$, which takes a value between 0 and 1, allows the description of different spectral shapes. When $\alpha=0$, the Cole-Cole model reduces to the Debye model. When $\alpha>0$, the relaxation is stretched. That is, it extends over a wider range on a logarithmic $\omega$ scale than Debye relaxation.

The separation of the complex dielectric constant $\varepsilon(\omega)$ was reported in the original paper by Kenneth Stewart Cole and Robert Hugh Cole as follows:

$\varepsilon' = \varepsilon_\infty+ (\varepsilon_s-\varepsilon_\infty)\frac{1+(\omega\tau)^{1-\alpha} \sin\alpha\pi/2}{1+2(\omega\tau)^{1-\alpha}\sin\alpha\pi/2+(\omega\tau)^{2(1-\alpha)}}$

$\varepsilon''=\frac{(\varepsilon_s-\varepsilon_\infty)(\omega\tau)^{1-\alpha}\cos\alpha\pi/2}{1+2(\omega\tau)^{1-\alpha}\sin\alpha\pi/2+(\omega\tau)^{2(1-\alpha)}}$

Upon introduction of hyperbolic functions, the above expressions reduce to:

$\varepsilon'=\varepsilon_\infty+\frac{1}{2}(\varepsilon_0-\varepsilon_\infty)\left[1-\frac{\sinh((1-\alpha)x)}{\cosh((1-\alpha)x)+\sin(\alpha\pi/2)}\right]$

$\varepsilon''=\frac{1}{2}(\varepsilon_0-\varepsilon_\infty)\frac{\cos(\alpha\pi/2)}{\cosh((1-\alpha)x)+\sin(\alpha\pi/2)}$

Here $x = \ln(\omega\tau)$.

These equations reduce to the Debye expression when $\alpha =0$.

The Cole-Cole equation's time domain current response corresponds to the Curie–von Schweidler law and the charge response corresponds to the stretched exponential function or the Kohlrausch–Williams–Watts (KWW) function, for small time arguments.

Cole–Cole relaxation constitutes a special case of Havriliak–Negami relaxation when the symmetry parameter $\beta=1$, that is, when the relaxation peaks are symmetric. Another special case of Havriliak–Negami relaxation where $\beta<1$ and $\alpha=1$ is known as Cole–Davidson relaxation. For an abridged and updated review of anomalous dielectric relaxation in disordered systems, see Kalmykov.

== See also ==
- Debye relaxation
- Cole–Davidson relaxation
- Havriliak–Negami relaxation
- Curie–von Schweidler law
