= Rudolf Kohlrausch =

German physicist

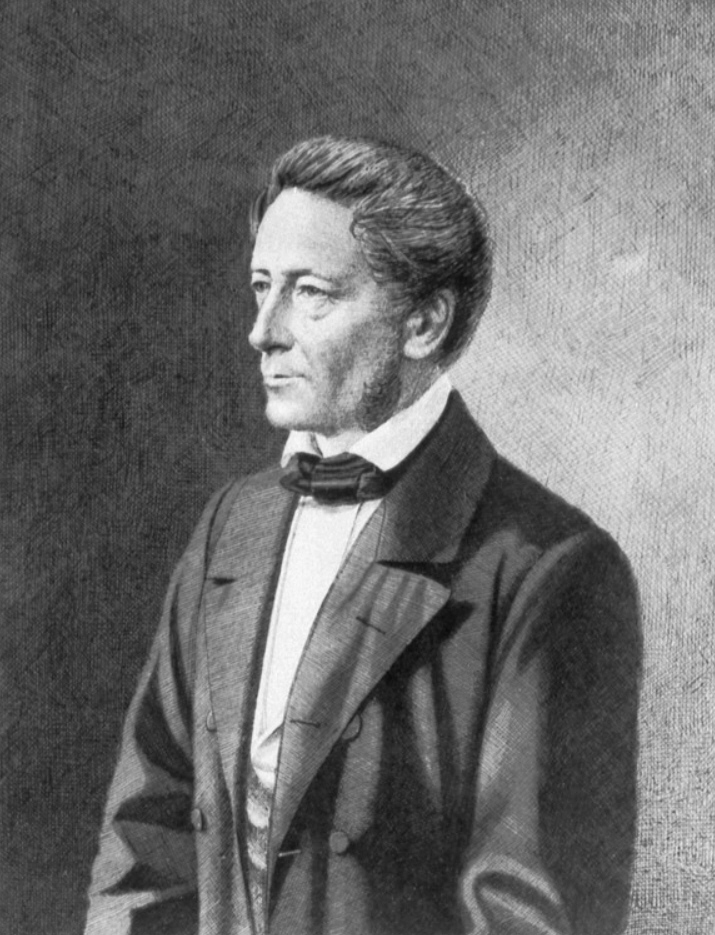
Rudolf Kohlrausch (1809-1858)

Rudolf Hermann Arndt Kohlrausch (November 6, 1809 in Göttingen – March 8, 1858 in Erlangen) was a German physicist.

== Biography ==
He was a native of Göttingen, the son of the Royal Hanovarian director general of schools Friedrich Kohlrausch. He was a high-school teacher of mathematics and physics successively at Lüneburg, Rinteln, Kassel and Marburg. In 1853 he became an associate professor at the University of Marburg, and four years later, a full professor of physics at the University of Erlangen.

== Research ==
In 1854 Kohlrausch introduced the relaxation phenomena, and used the stretched exponential function to explain relaxation effects of a discharging Leyden jar (capacitor). In an 1855 experiment (published 1857) with Wilhelm Weber (1804–1891), he demonstrated that the ratio of electrostatic to electromagnetic units produced a number similar to the value of the speed of light, a constant which they named $c$. Kirchhoff recognized that the ratio is equal to $\sqrt 2$ the speed of light. This finding was instrumental towards Maxwell's conjecture that light is an electromagnetic wave.

== Family ==
He was the father of physicist Friedrich Kohlrausch.

== Published works ==
- Elektrodynamische Maaßbestimmungen : insbesondere Zurückführung der Stromintensitäts-Messungen auf mechanisches Maass (with Wilhelm Weber) 1857. "Electrodynamic Measurements, Especially Attributing Mechanical Units to Measures of Current Intensity". German text. English translation

== See also ==
- Kohlrausch function
- Kohlrausch volumetric flask
