= Prabhakar function =

Prabhakar function is a certain special function in mathematics introduced by the Indian mathematician Tilak Raj Prabhakar in a paper published in 1971. The function is a three-parameter generalization of the well known two-parameter Mittag-Leffler function in mathematics. The function was originally introduced to solve certain classes of integral equations. Later the function was found to have applications in the theory of fractional calculus and also in certain areas of physics.

== Definition ==
The one-parameter and two-parameter Mittag-Leffler functions are defined first. Then the definition of the three-parameter Mittag-Leffler function, the Prabhakar function, is presented. In the following definitions, $\Gamma (z)$ is the well known gamma function defined by

$$\Gamma(z)= \int_0^\infty t^{z-1}e^{-z}\, dz, \quad\Re(z) > 0$$.

In the following it will be assumed that $\alpha$, $\beta$ and $\gamma$ are all complex numbers.

=== One-parameter Mittag-Leffler function ===
The one-parameter Mittag-Leffler function is defined as

$$E_\alpha(z)=\sum_{n=0}^\infty \dfrac{z^n}{\Gamma(\alpha n + 1)}.$$

=== Two-parameter Mittag-Leffler function ===
The two-parameter Mittag-Leffler function is defined as

$$E_{\alpha, \beta}(z)=\sum_{n=0}^\infty \dfrac{z^n}{\Gamma(\alpha n + \beta)}, \quad \Re(\alpha) >0.$$

=== Three-parameter Mittag-Leffler function (Prabhakar function) ===
The three-parameter Mittag-Leffler function (Prabhakar function) is defined by

$$E_{\alpha, \beta}^\gamma (z)=\sum_{n=0}^\infty \dfrac{(\gamma)_n}{n!\Gamma(\alpha n + \beta)} z^n, \quad \Re(\alpha)>0$$

where $(\gamma)_n=\gamma(\gamma+1)\ldots (\gamma+n-1)$.

== Elementary special cases ==
The following special cases immediately follow from the definition.

1. $E_{\alpha,\beta}^0 (z)= \frac{1}{\Gamma(\beta)}$
2. $E_{\alpha,\beta}^1 (z)= E_{\alpha,\beta}(z)$, the two-parameter Mittag-Leffler function.
3. $E_{\alpha,1}^1 (z)= E_{\alpha}(z)$, the one-parameter Mittag-Leffler function.
4. $E_{1, 1}^1 (z) = e^z$, the classical exponential function.

== Properties ==
=== Reduction formula ===
The following formula can be reduced to lower the value of the third parameter $\gamma$.

$$E_{\alpha,\beta}^{\gamma+1} (z) = \frac{1}{\alpha\gamma}\big[ E_{\alpha, \beta -1}^\gamma(z) + (1-\beta+\alpha\gamma)E_{\alpha,\beta}^\gamma(z)\big]$$

=== Relation with Fox–Wright function ===
The Prabhakar function is related to the Fox–Wright function by the following relation:

$$E_{\alpha, \beta}^\gamma(z) = \frac{1}{\Gamma(\gamma)}{}_1\Psi_1 \left(\begin{matrix}\left(\gamma, 1\right)\\(\beta,\alpha)\end{matrix};z \right)$$

=== Derivatives ===
The derivative of the Prabhakar function is given by

$$\frac{d}{dz}\left( E_{\alpha,\beta}^\gamma(z)\right) = \frac{1}{\alpha z}\big[ E_{\alpha, \beta-1}^\gamma(z) + (1-\beta)E_{\alpha, \beta}^\gamma\big]$$

There is a general expression for higher order derivatives. Let $m$ be a positive integer. The $m$-th derivative of the Prabhakar function is given by

$$\frac{d^m}{dz^m}\left( E_{\alpha,\beta}^\gamma(z)\right) = \frac{\Gamma(\gamma+m)}{\Gamma(\gamma)}E_{\alpha, m\alpha+\beta}^{\gamma+m}(z)$$

The following result is useful in applications.

$$\frac{d^m}{dz^m}\left( t^{\beta-1} E_{\alpha,\beta}^\gamma(t^\alpha z) \right) = t^{\beta - m -1} E_{\alpha, \beta-m}^\gamma(t^\alpha z)$$

=== Integrals ===
The following result involving Prabhakar function is known.

$$\int_0^t  \tau^{\beta-1} E_{\alpha,\beta}^\gamma(\tau^\alpha z) = t^\beta E_{\alpha, \beta+1}^\gamma(t^\alpha z)$$

=== Laplace transforms ===
The following result involving Laplace transforms plays an important role in both physical applications and numerical computations of the Prabhakar function.

$$L \left[ t^{\beta - 1} E_{\alpha, \beta}^\gamma (t^\alpha z)\, ;\, s\right] =\frac{s^{\alpha\gamma-\beta}}{(s^\alpha - z)^\gamma},\quad \Re(s)>0,\quad |s|>|z|^{1/\alpha}$$

== Prabhakar fractional calculus ==
The following function is known as the Prabhakar kernel in the literature.

$$e_{\alpha,\beta}^\gamma (t;\lambda) = t^{\beta -1} E_{\alpha,\beta}^\gamma(\lambda t^\alpha)$$

Given any function $f(t)$, the convolution of the Prabhakar kernel and $f(t)$ is called the Prabhakar fractional integral:

$$\int_{t_0}^t (t-u)^{\beta -1} E_{\alpha,\beta}^\gamma \left( \lambda (t-u)^\alpha\right) f(u)\, du$$

Properties of the Prabhakar fractional integral have been extensively studied in the literature.
