= Egon Schweidler =

Austrian physicist

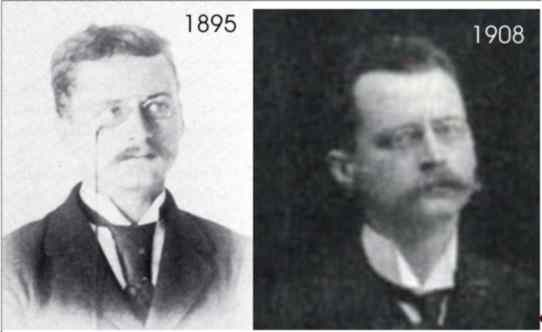
Egon von Schweidler 1895 and 1908

Egon Schweidler (10 February 1873–10 February 1948), known until 1919 as Egon Ritter von Schweidler, was an Austrian physicist. The von Schweidler law in dielectrics is named after him.

== Biography ==
He was born in 1873 in Vienna as the son of the court and Gerichtsadvokaten Emil von Schweidler, who was born in Vienna. After studying physics and mathematics, he earned his doctorate with a dissertation, "On the internal friction of mercury and some Amalgamen" (1895). He was an assistant to Franz Exner.

=== Career ===
In 1899, he went to the University of Vienna. In 1911, he was appointed as an associate professor. From 1911 to 1926, he was the head of the Department of Experimental Physics at the University of Innsbruck, where he was dean in 1924 and rector in 1925/26. In 1926, he returned as per his appeal as an Ordinary II at the Physics Institute of the University of Vienna. There, he also worked as a secretary (1929–1933), Secretary-General (1933–1938), and Vice President (1939–1945) of the Austrian Academy of Sciences. In 1933, he was also elected chairman of the German Physical Society.

He died in Salzburg Seeham in 1948.

== Legacy ==
From an historical view, his major works in the field of atmospheric electricity should be mentioned. Schweidler's scientific work was recognized very early (1907) with the award of the "Baumgartner Prize" of the Vienna Academy of Sciences for the study of the anomalies in the behaviour of dielectrics. He pointed out (in 1899) with Stefan Meyer, among others, the statistical nature of the radioactive decay or the magnetic deflection of beta radiation as fast electrons. His predicted variations (1905) of the ionization radiation formed in the end a large number of theoretical and experimental investigations.

== See also ==
- Curie–von Schweidler law

== Publications ==
- Die atmosphärische Elektrizität, 1903 (mit H. Mach)
  - TR: The atmospheric electricity, 1903 (with H. Mach)
- Über Schwankungen der radioaktiven Umwandlung, Comptes Rendus du Premier Congres International pour L’etude de la Radiologie et de Ionisation, Liege, 12.-14.
  - TR: About fluctuations of the radioactive transformation, Comptes Rendus Prime du Congres International pour la de L'etude et de Radiologie ionization, Liege, 12.-14. September 1905 September 1905
- Standardwerk über Radioaktivität, (mit S. Meyer), 1916 (2. Auflage 1927)
  - TR:Standard work on radioactivity, (with S. Meyer), 1916 (2nd edition 1927)

== Sources ==
- Berta Karlik, Erich Schmid: Franz Serafin Exner und sein Kreis. Verlag der Österreichischen Akadademie der Wissenschaft, Wien 1982, ISBN 3-7001-0437-5
  - TR: Franz Exner and his circle.
- Wolfgang L. Reiter: Stefan Meyer: Pioneer of Radioactivity. Physics in Perspective. Volume 3, Issue 1, pp. 106–127, 2001 106-127 2001
- Max von Laue: History of Physics. 1966
