= Attorney General Fox =

Attorney General Fox may refer to:

- Tim Fox (politician) (born 1957), Attorney General of Montana
- William Fox (politician) (1812–1893), Attorney-General of New Zealand

== See also ==
- General Fox (disambiguation)
