= Ram Kishore Saxena =

Indian mathematician

Ram Kishore Saxena DSc, FNASc
- Born: 11 November 1936 (age 89); Jaipur Rajasthan
- Education: University of Rajasthan BSc, MSc 1956, PhD1962 University of Jodhpur DSc 1971
- Alma mater: McGill University, Research Associate University of Jodhpur University of Rajasthan
- Organization(s): University of Sulaymaniyah Associate Professor Al-Fateh University Professor University of Jodhpur Jaswant College, Jodhpur Lohia College, Churu Maharana Bhupal College, Udaipur Mohanlal Sukhadia University Jai Narain Vyas University
- Known for: Mathematics
- Notable work: Fox H-function, Meijer G-function
- Spouse: Bimlesh Saxena
- Awards: Post-Doctoral Fellowship of National Research Council Canada Fellow of National Academy of Sciences, India

Ram Kishore Saxena D.Sc, FNASc (born 11 November 1936) is an Indian mathematician and Emeritus professor, UGC Jai Narain Vyas University and former Professor and Head, Department of Mathematics.

== Published work ==
Saxena has published 356 research papers; under his supervision many scholars has done PhD and post-doctoral research. Saxena has published books.
