= Cole–Davidson equation =

The Cole–Davidson equation is a model used to describe dielectric relaxation in glass-forming liquids. The equation for the complex permittivity is

$$\hat{\varepsilon}(\omega) = \varepsilon_{\infty} + \frac{\Delta\varepsilon}{(1+i\omega\tau)^{\beta}},$$

where $\varepsilon_{\infty}$ is the permittivity at the high frequency limit, $\Delta\varepsilon = \varepsilon_{s}-\varepsilon_{\infty}$ where $\varepsilon_{s}$ is the static, low frequency permittivity, and $\tau$ is the characteristic relaxation time of the medium. The exponent $\beta$ represents the exponent of the decay of the high frequency wing of the imaginary part, $\varepsilon''(\omega) \sim \omega^{-\beta}$.

The equation is named after Robert Hugh Cole and D.W. Davidson, who developed it in 1950.

The Cole–Davidson equation is a generalization of the Debye relaxation keeping the initial increase of the low frequency wing of the imaginary part, $\varepsilon''(\omega) \sim \omega$. Because this is also a characteristic feature of the Fourier transform of the stretched exponential function it has been considered as an approximation of the latter, although nowadays an approximation by the Havriliak–Negami function or exact numerical calculation may be preferred.

Because the slopes of the peak in $\varepsilon''(\omega)$ in double-logarithmic representation are different it is considered an asymmetric generalization in contrast to the Cole–Cole equation.

The Cole–Davidson equation is the special case of the Havriliak–Negami relaxation with $\alpha=1$.

The real and imaginary parts are

$$\varepsilon'(\omega) = \varepsilon_{\infty} + \Delta\varepsilon\left( 1 + (\omega\tau)^{2} \right)^{-\beta/2} \cos (\beta\arctan(\omega\tau))$$

and

$$\varepsilon''(\omega) = \Delta\varepsilon\left( 1 + (\omega\tau)^{2} \right)^{-\beta/2} \sin (\beta\arctan(\omega\tau))$$

== See also ==
- Debye relaxation
- Cole-Cole relaxation
- Havriliak–Negami relaxation
- Curie–von Schweidler law
