= Indicator function (complex analysis) =

Notion from the theory of entire functions

In the field of mathematics known as complex analysis, the indicator function of an entire function indicates the rate of growth of the function in different directions.

== Definition ==
Let us consider an entire function $f : \Complex \to \Complex$. Supposing, that its growth order is $\rho$, the indicator function of $f$ is defined to be
$$h_f(\theta)=\limsup_{r\to\infty}\frac{\log|f(re^{i\theta})|}{r^\rho}.$$

The indicator function can be also defined for functions which are not entire but analytic inside an angle $D = \{z=re^{i\theta}:\alpha<\theta<\beta\}$.

== Basic properties ==
By the very definition of the indicator function, we have that the indicator of the product of two functions does not exceed the sum of the indicators:
$$h_{fg}(\theta)\le h_f(\theta)+h_g(\theta).$$

Similarly, the indicator of the sum of two functions does not exceed the larger of the two indicators:
$$h_{f+g}(\theta)\le \max\{h_f(\theta),h_g(\theta)\}.$$

== Examples ==
Elementary calculations show that, if $f(z)=e^{(A+iB)z^\rho}$, then $|f(re^{i\theta})|=e^{Ar^\rho\cos(\rho\theta)-Br^\rho\sin(\rho\theta)}$. Thus,
$$h_f(\theta) = A\cos(\rho\theta)-B\sin(\rho\theta).$$

In particular,
$$h_{\exp}(\theta) = \cos(\theta).$$

Since the complex sine and cosine functions are expressible in terms of the exponential, it follows from the above result that

$$h_{\sin}(\theta)=h_{\cos}(\theta)= \left|\sin(\theta)\right|$$

Another easily deducible indicator function is that of the reciprocal Gamma function. However, this function is of infinite type (and of order $\rho = 1$), therefore one needs to define the indicator function to be
$$h_{1/\Gamma}(\theta) = \limsup_{r\to\infty}\frac{\log|1/\Gamma(re^{i\theta})|}{r\log r}.$$

Stirling's approximation of the Gamma function then yields, that
$$h_{1/\Gamma}(\theta)=-\cos(\theta).$$

Another example is that of the Mittag-Leffler function $E_\alpha$. This function is of order $\rho = 1/\alpha$, and

$$h_{E_\alpha}(\theta)=\begin{cases}\cos\left(\frac{\theta}{\alpha}\right),&\text{for }|\theta|\le\frac 1 2 \alpha\pi;\\0,&\text{otherwise}.\end{cases}$$

The indicator of the Barnes G-function can be calculated easily from its asymptotic expression (which roughly says that $\log G(z+1)\sim \frac{z^2}{2}\log z$):

$$h_G(\theta)=\frac{\log(G(re^{i\theta}))}{r^2\log(r)} = \frac12\cos(2\theta).$$

== Further properties of the indicator ==
Those $h$ indicator functions which are of the form
$$h(\theta)=A\cos(\rho\theta)+B\sin(\rho\theta)$$
are called $\rho$-trigonometrically convex ($A$ and $B$ are real constants). If $\rho = 1$, we simply say, that $h$ is trigonometrically convex.

Such indicators have some special properties. For example, the following statements are all true for an indicator function that is trigonometrically convex at least on an interval $(\alpha,\beta)$:

- If $h(\theta_1)=-\infty$ for a $\theta_1\in(\alpha,\beta)$, then $h = -\infty$ everywhere in $(\alpha,\beta)$.
- If $h$ is bounded on $(\alpha,\beta)$, then it is continuous on this interval. Moreover, $h$ satisfies a Lipschitz condition on $(\alpha,\beta)$.
- If $h$ is bounded on $(\alpha,\beta)$, then it has both left-hand-side and right-hand-side derivative at every point in the interval $(\alpha,\beta)$. Moreover, the left-hand-side derivative is not greater than the right-hand-side derivative. It also holds true, that the right-hand-side derivative is continuous from the right, while the left-hand-side derivative is continuous from the left.
- If $h$ is bounded on $(\alpha,\beta)$, then it has a derivative at all points, except possibly on a countable set.
- If $h$ is $\rho$-trigonometrically convex on $[\alpha,\beta]$, then $h(\theta)+h(\theta+\pi/\rho) \ge 0$, whenever $\alpha \le \theta < \theta+\pi/\rho\le\beta$.
