= Curie–von Schweidler law =

Physical law related to dielectrics

The Curie–von Schweidler law refers to the response of dielectric material to the step input of a direct current (DC) voltage first observed by Jacques Curie in 1889, and independently by Egon Ritter von Schweidler in 1907.

The Curie-von Schweidler law corresponds to the time domain current response of the main dielectric models, such as the Cole–Cole equation, the Cole–Davidson equation, and the Havriliak–Negami relaxation, for small time arguments.

== Overview ==
According to this law, the current decays according to a power law:

$$I\left(t\right) \propto t^{-n},$$

where $I\left(t\right)$ is the current at a given charging time, $t$, and $n$ is the decay constant such that $0<n<1$. Given that the dielectric has a finite conductance, the equation for current measured through a dielectric under a DC electrical field is:

$$I\left(t\right) = a\left(\frac{t}{\tau}\right)^{-n},$$

where $a$ is a constant of proportionality. This stands in contrast to the Debye formulation, which states that the current is proportional an exponential function with a time constant, $\tau$, according to:

$$I\left(t\right) \propto \exp\left\{-t/ \tau\right\}$$.

The Curie–von Schweidler behavior has been observed in many instances such as those shown by Andrzej K. Jonscher and N. Jameson et al. It has been interpreted as a many-body problem by Jonscher, but can also be formulated as an infinite number of resistor-capacitor circuits. This comes from the fact that the power law can be expressed as:

$$t^{-n} = \frac{1}{\Gamma\left(n\right)} \int_0^\infty \tau^{-\left(n+1\right)} e^{-t/ \tau} d\tau,$$

where $\Gamma\left(n\right)$ is the Gamma function. Effectively, this relationship shows the power law expression to be equivalent to an infinite weighted sum of Debye responses which is mathematically correct but not quite useful for the purpose of modelling and simulation. Interestingly, the power-law nature of the Curie–von Schweidler law motivated the birth of the fractional capacitor in electrical modelling and in describing anomalous dielectric behaviour. The fractional capacitor displays an interplay between a resistor and capacitor for values of $n$ lying between $0$ and $1$.

== Further developments ==
Recently, Vikash Pandey gave a theoretical derivation of the Curie–von Schweidler law which also seems to be the first work that gave a physical interpretation to its parameters. Pandey assumed a series combination of a resistor, $R$, and a capacitor with a linear time varying capacitance, $C(t)$, such that,

$C(t)=C_{0}+\theta t$, $\theta = dC(t)/dt > 0$, where $C_{0}$ is the constant geometric capacitance. He found,

$a = \frac{V_{0}}{R} \text{, } n = \frac{1}{R\theta} \text{, and } \tau = \frac{C_{0}}{\theta}$, where $V_{0}$ is the applied constant voltage. A key intermediate finding in this derivation is that the charge accumulation in a capacitor with a time-varying capacitance should not be described by the conventional charge-voltage relation of the capacitor, $Q=CV$, because it is only applicable for the case of a constant-capacitance capacitor and therefore it leads to inconsistent results. Rather, for time-varying capacitors the appropriate relation is given by the convolution of the capacitance with the first time-derivative of the voltage, i.e., $Q(t)=C(t)*\dot V(t)$. Surprisingly, the convolution relation reduces to the conventional relation in the case of the constant-capacitance capacitor. The results obtained by Pandey satisfy the experimental data quite well. Consequently, a physical interpretation of the fractional derivatives and the fractional capacitor are now available.
