= Charles Fox (engraver) =

English engraver (1794–1849)

Charles Fox (1794–1849) was an English engraver.

== Life ==
Fox was born at Cossey, near Norwich, where his father was steward to Lord Stafford, of Cossey Hall. After a period of studying engraving under Edwards at Bungay, he came up to London, became an inmate in the studio of John Burnet, who was at that time engaged in engraving some of Wilkie's principal works, and assisted Burnet in their completion.

When John Lindley, his fellow-townsman, was appointed secretary of the Horticultural Society, Fox was chosen as a judge and arbitrator for its prizes. He also executed all the engravings for a periodical called The Florist. He died at Leyton in 1849,

== Works ==
Fox engraved plates after Wilkie for Robert Cadell's edition of Sir Walter Scott's novels, and various illustrations to the Annuals of the day. His large engravings are a whole-length portrait of Sir George Murray, after Pickersgill; The First Council of the Queen and Village Recruits, after Wilkie. At the time of his death he was engaged upon a large print after William Mulready's picture of The Fight interrupted.
