= Fox H-function =

Generalization of the Meijer G-function and the Fox–Wright function

In mathematics, the Fox H-function $H(z)$ is a generalization of the Meijer G-function and the Fox–Wright function introduced by Charles Fox (1961). It is defined by the Mellin–Barnes integral

$$H_{p,q}^{\,m,n} \!\left[ z \left| \begin{matrix}
( a_1 , A_1 ) & ( a_2 , A_2 ) & \ldots & ( a_p , A_p ) \\
( b_1 , B_1 ) & ( b_2 , B_2 ) & \ldots & ( b_q , B_q ) \end{matrix} \right. \right]
= \frac{1}{2\pi i}\int_L
\frac
{\prod_{j=1}^m\Gamma(b_j+B_js) \, \prod_{j=1}^n\Gamma(1-a_j-A_js)}
{\prod_{j=m+1}^q\Gamma(1-b_j-B_js) \, \prod_{j=n+1}^p\Gamma(a_j+A_js)}
z^{-s} \, ds,$$

where L is a certain contour separating the poles of the two factors in the numerator.

Plot of the Fox H function H((((a 1,α 1),...,(a n,α n)),((a n+1,α n+1),...,(a p,α p)),(((b 1,β 1),...,(b m,β m)),in ((b m+1,β m+1),...,(b q,β q))),z) with H(((),()),(((-1,1/2)),()),z)

== Relation to other functions ==
=== Meijer G-function ===
Compare to the Meijer G-function

$$G_{p,q}^{\,m,n} \!\left( \left. \begin{matrix} a_1, \dots, a_p \\ b_1, \dots, b_q \end{matrix} \; \right| \, z \right) = \frac{1}{2 \pi i} \int_L
\frac
{\prod_{j=1}^m \Gamma(b_j - s) \, \prod_{j=1}^n \Gamma(1 - a_j +s)}
{\prod_{j=m+1}^q \Gamma(1 - b_j + s) \, \prod_{j=n+1}^p \Gamma(a_j - s)} \,z^s \,ds.$$

The special case for which the Fox H reduces to the Meijer G is A_{j} = B_{k} = C, C > 0 for j = 1...p and k = 1...q :

$$H_{p,q}^{\,m,n} \!\left[ z \left| \begin{matrix}
( a_1 , C ) & ( a_2 , C ) & \ldots & ( a_p , C ) \\
( b_1 , C ) & ( b_2 , C ) & \ldots & ( b_q , C  ) \end{matrix} \right. \right]
= \frac{1}{C}
G_{p,q}^{\,m,n} \!\left( \left. \begin{matrix} a_1, \dots, a_p \\ b_1, \dots, b_q \end{matrix} \; \right| \, z^{1/C} \right).$$

=== Lambert W-function ===
A relation of the Fox H-Function to the -1 branch of the Lambert W-function is given by

$$\overline{W_{-1}\left( -\alpha z \right)} = \lim_{\beta \to \alpha^{-}}
\begin{cases}
\frac{\alpha^{2}}{\beta} \left( \left( \alpha - \beta \right) z \right)^{\frac{\alpha}{\beta}\hphantom{-}} H_{1,2}^{1,1}
\Bigg( -\left( \left( \alpha - \beta \right) z \right)^{\frac{\alpha}{\beta} - 1}
\Bigg| \begin{matrix}
\big( \frac{\alpha + \beta}{\beta},\, \frac{\alpha}{\beta} \big) \\
\big( 0,\, 1 \big),\, \big( -\frac{\alpha}{\beta},\, \frac{\alpha - \beta}{\beta} \big)
\end{matrix} \Bigg) ,\, \text{if} \left| z \right| < \frac{1}{e \left| \alpha \right|} \\
\frac{\alpha^{2}}{\beta} \left( \left( \alpha - \beta \right) z \right)^{-\frac{\alpha}{\beta}} H_{2,1}^{1,1}
\Bigg( -\left( \left( \alpha - \beta \right) z \right)^{1 - \frac{\alpha}{\beta}}
\Bigg| \begin{matrix}
\big( 1,\, 1 \big),\, \big( \frac{\beta - \alpha}{\beta},\, \frac{\alpha - \beta}{\beta} \big)\\
\big( -\frac{\alpha}{\beta},\, \frac{\alpha}{\beta} \big)
\end{matrix} \Bigg) ,\, \text{else}\\ \end{cases}$$

where $\overline{z}$ is the complex conjugate of $z$.

=== Generalizations ===
A generalization of the Fox H-function was given by Ram Kishore Saxena. A further generalization of this function, useful in physics and statistics, was provided by A.M. Mathai and Ram Kishore Saxena.
