= Multani Mal Modi College =

College in Patiala, Punjab, India

Multani Mal Modi College, Patiala
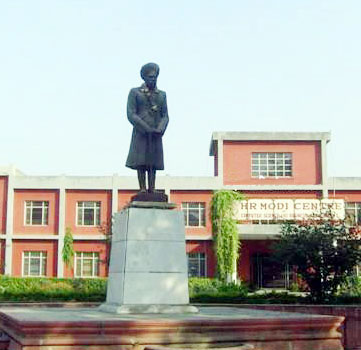
- Motto: Tamaso ma Jyotirgamay (tamaso ma jyotirgamay : Lead Me from darkness to light)
- Type: Private
- Established: Dec 1967
- Affiliations: Punjabi University
- Principal: Neeraj Goyal
- Location: Patiala, Punjab, India; 30.3174°N 76.3949°E
- Campus: Urban
- Website: www.modicollege.com

Multani Mal Modi College is an autonomous college located in Patiala, Punjab, India.

== History ==
Multani Mal Modi College was established in 1967 with financial help from Gujarmal Modi. It was established by the Padma Bhushan, Gujarmal Modi, a business magnate of India, in the memory of his father Multani Mal Modi. Its foundation stone was laid by Dharam Vira, ICS, the then Governor of Punjab on 21 September 1966 and the first academic session commenced in July 1967.

== Description and governance ==
The college is affiliated to Punjabi University, Patiala, and is managed by Rai Bahadur Multani Mal Modi Charitable Trust.

The college is owned and maintained by the Modi Education Society, headed by Seth Sudarshan Kumar Modi.

== Faculty ==
=== Principals ===
- H R Juneja (05-06-1967 - 23 January 1970)
- H R Jindal (06-06-1970 - 31 August 1983)
- Raj Kumar Phul (17-07-1985 - 17 June 1987)
- O P Vijh (18-06-1987 - 18 January 1991)
- O P Dhiman (06-08-1991 - 8 September 1993)
- S R Sahni (03-06-1994 - 31 December 2000)
- Surindra Lal (01-01-2001 - 31-03 -2004)
- V K Sharma (01-07-2004 - 1 August 2006)
- Satish K Bhardwaj (01-12-2006 - 31 December 2013)
- Khushvinder Kumar (01-01-2014 to ?)

== Notable alumni ==
- Navneet Nishan - Bollywood actress
- Shekhar Gurera - editorial cartoonist
- Vijay Inder Singla - Indian politician, member of Punjab Legislative Assembly
