= Henriette Kohlrausch =

German botanist and naturalist

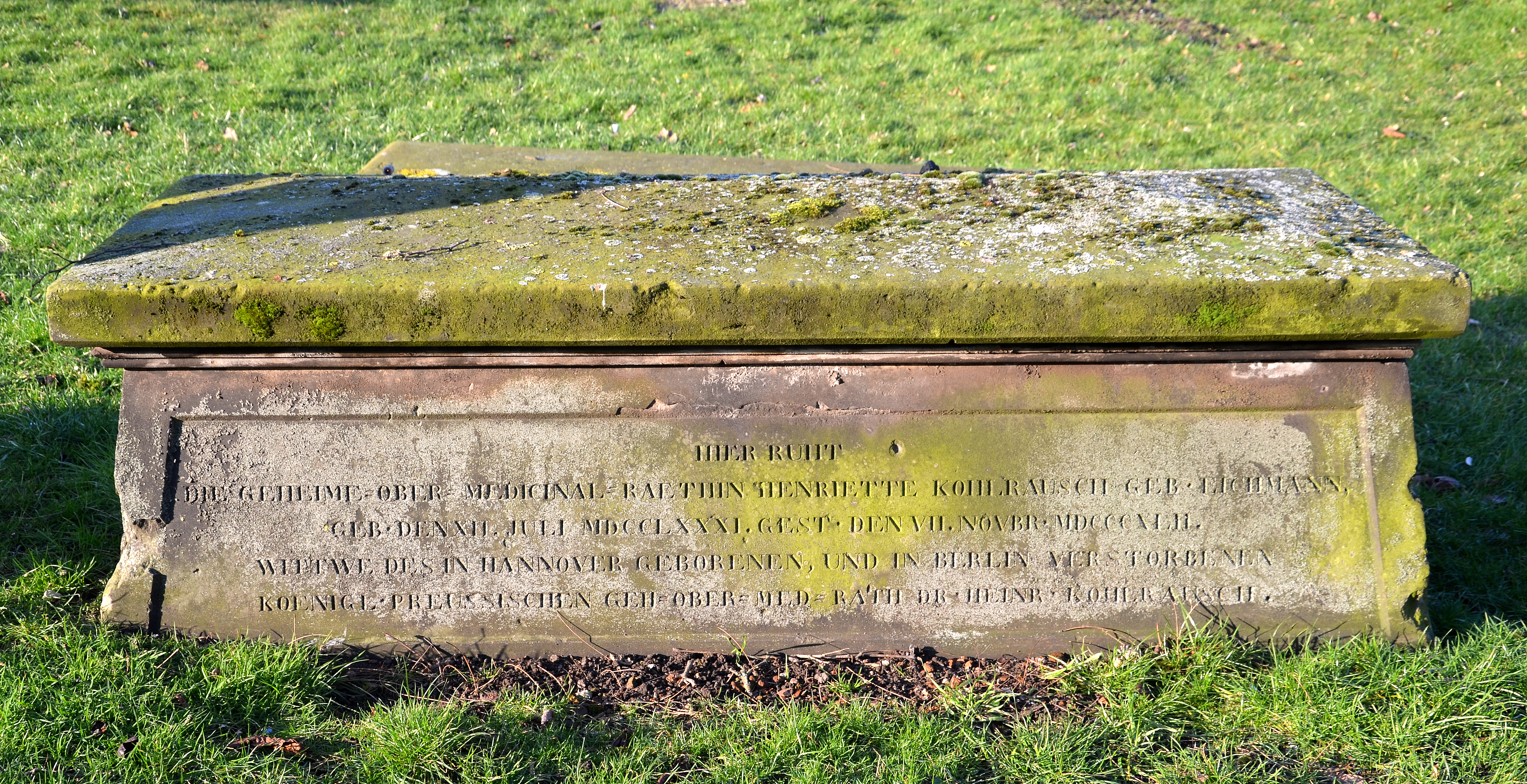
- Henriette Kohlrausch's grave
- Born: Henriette Eichmann; 12 July 1781; Hanover
- Died: 7 November 1842 (aged 61); Hanover
- Resting place: Alter St.-Nikolai-Friedhof
- Known for: transcribing Alexander von Humboldt's Kosmos lectures
- Spouse: Heinrich Kohlrausch (1780 - 1826)
- Scientific career
- Fields: botany

Henriette Kohlrausch (12 July 1781 – 7 November 1842) née Eichmann was a German botanist and naturalist known for transcribing Alexander von Humbolt's "Kosmos" lectures.

In recognition of her contributions to his work Flora Berolinensis, Carl Sigismund Kunth, in 1838, named the plant genus Kohlrauschia in her honour. This genus name has subsequently been synonymised with the genus Petrorhagia. During her lifetime Kohlrausch was also the lady-in-waiting to the Queen of Hanover, Duchess Frederica of Mecklenburg-Strelitz.

== Family ==
Henriette Kohlrausch was the daughter of Johann Wilhelm Eichmann, the Privy Councillor of Finance. She obtained an education and was particularly interested in botany. In 1815 she married Heinrich Kolrausch, the Privy Senior Medical Councillor.
