= Charles Fox (mathematician) =

Canadian mathematician (1897–1977)

Charles Fox (17 March 1897, in London – 30 April 1977, in Montreal) was the English mathematician who introduced the Fox–Wright function and the Fox H-function. In 1976, he received an honorary doctorate from Concordia University.
