= Wright omega function =

Mathematical function

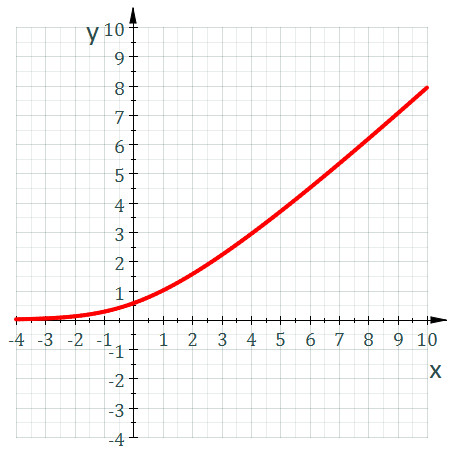
The Wright omega function along part of the real axis

In mathematics, the Wright omega function or Wright function, (Note: Not to be confused with the Fox–Wright function, also known as Wright function.) denoted ω, is defined in terms of the Lambert W function as:

$$\omega(z) = W_{\big \lceil \frac{\mathrm{Im}(z) - \pi}{2 \pi} \big \rceil}(e^z).$$

It is simpler to be defined by its inverse function

$$z (\omega) = \ln(\omega)+\omega$$

== Uses ==
One of the main applications of this function is in the resolution of the equation z = ln(z), as the only solution is given by z = e^{−ω(π i)}.

y = ω(z) is the unique solution, when $z \neq x \pm i \pi$ for x ≤ −1, of the equation y + ln(y) = z. Except for those two values, the Wright omega function is continuous, even analytic.

== Properties ==
The Wright omega function satisfies the relation $W_k(z) = \omega(\ln(z) + 2 \pi i k)$.

It also satisfies the differential equation

$$\frac{d\omega}{dz} = \frac{\omega}{1 + \omega}$$

wherever ω is analytic (as can be seen by performing separation of variables and recovering the equation $\ln(\omega)+\omega = z$, and as a consequence its integral can be expressed as:

$$\int \omega^n \, dz =
\begin{cases}
\frac{\omega^{n+1} -1 }{n+1} + \frac{\omega^n}{n}  & \mbox{if } n \neq -1, \\
\ln(\omega) - \frac{1}{\omega} & \mbox{if } n = -1.
\end{cases}$$

Its Taylor series around the point $a = \omega_a + \ln(\omega_a)$ takes the form :

$$\omega(z) = \sum_{n=0}^{+\infty} \frac{q_n(\omega_a)}{(1+\omega_a)^{2n-1}}\frac{(z-a)^n}{n!}$$

where

$$q_n(w) = \sum_{k=0}^{n-1} \bigg \langle \! \! \bigg \langle
\begin{matrix}
n+1 \\
k
\end{matrix}
\bigg \rangle \! \! \bigg \rangle (-1)^k w^{k+1}$$

in which

$$\bigg \langle \! \! \bigg \langle
\begin{matrix}
n \\
k
\end{matrix}
\bigg \rangle \! \! \bigg \rangle$$

is a second-order Eulerian number.

== Values ==
$$\begin{array}{lll}
\omega(0) &= W_0(1) &\approx 0.56714 \\
\omega(1) &= 1 & \\
\omega(-1 \pm i \pi) &= -1 & \\
\omega(-\frac{1}{3} + \ln \left ( \frac{1}{3} \right ) + i \pi ) &= -\frac{1}{3} & \\
\omega(-\frac{1}{3} + \ln \left ( \frac{1}{3} \right ) - i \pi ) &= W_{-1} \left ( -\frac{1}{3} e^{-\frac{1}{3}} \right ) &\approx -2.237147028 \\
\end{array}$$

== Plots ==
Plots of the Wright omega function on the complex plane

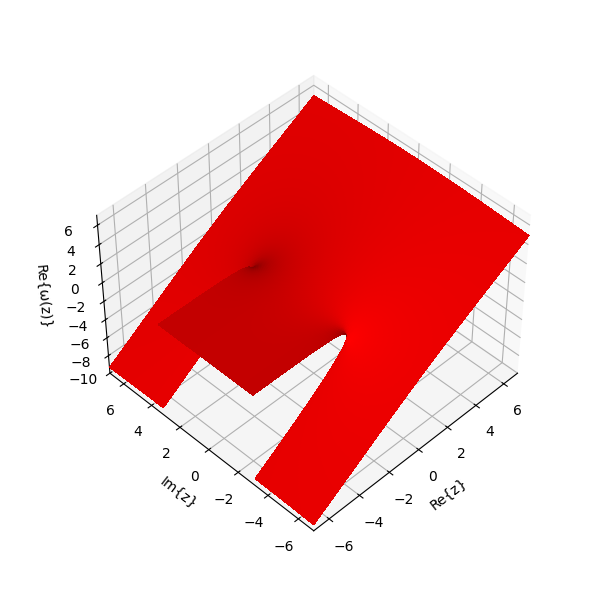
$\Re\{\omega(z)\}$

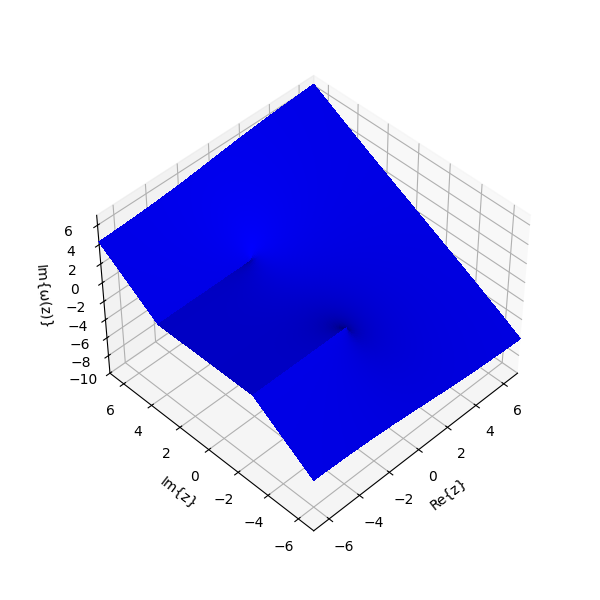
$\Im\{\omega(z)\}$

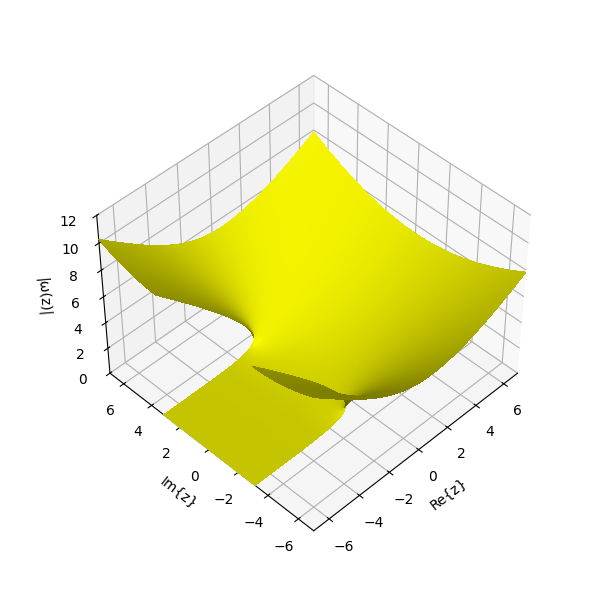
$|\omega(z)|$
