= Otto Kohlrausch =

German physician and surgeon

Otto Ludwig Bernhard Kohlrausch (20 March 1811 – 14 November 1854) was a German medical doctor and surgeon born in Barmen. His son Christian Georg Kohlrausch (1851-1934) rediscovered the discus throw.

He studied natural sciences at the University of Bonn and medicine at University of Göttingen. He visited hospitals in Copenhagen and London, then in 1835 started a medical practice in Hanover. In 1841 he established a health spa at Bad Rehburg on behalf of the government.

Otto Kohlrausch was a member of a distinguished family of scientists and scholars, and was an uncle of the famed physicist Friedrich Kohlrausch (1840–1910). The eponymous "Kohlrausch's valves" are named after him (also known as the transverse rectal folds). Another anatomical structure associated with his name is "Kohlrausch's muscle", a term used to refer to any of the longitudinal muscles of the rectal wall.

== Selected publications ==
- Physiologie und Chemie in ihrer gegenseitigen Stellung (Physiology and chemistry in complementary positions); (Göttingen 1844).
- Zur Anatomie und Physiologie der Beckenorgane (The anatomy and physiology of the pelvic organs); (Leipzig 1854).
