= Friedrich Kohlrausch (educator) =

German educator and historian

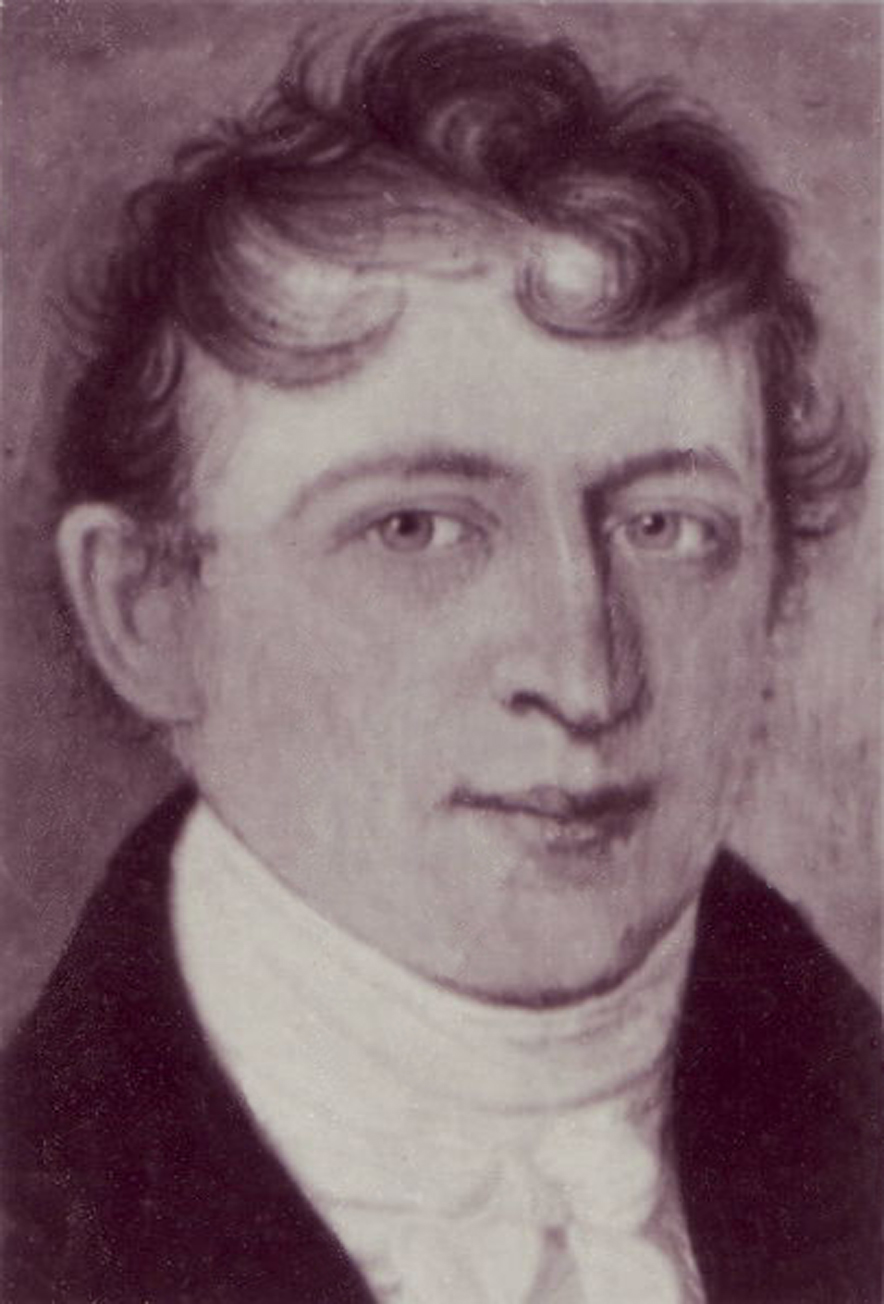
Heinrich Friedrich Theodor Kohlrausch (1780-1867)

Heinrich Friedrich Theodor Kohlrausch (November 15, 1780 – January 30, 1867) was a German educator and historian.

He was the father of physicist Rudolf Kohlrausch (1809–1858) and surgeon Otto Kohlrausch (1811–1854).

== Biography ==
He was born in Landolfshausen. He was a student at the University of Göttingen, later continuing his education at the universities of Berlin, Kiel, and Heidelberg. He was then a teacher in Barmen (from 1810), Düsseldorf (from 1814), and Münster (from 1818).

In 1830 he was appointed Generalschuldirektor (Director General of Schools) by the Royal Hanoverian government. In this role he introduced several administrative reforms and standards to the curriculum, and he stressed the importance of subjects such as natural sciences, history and gymnastics.

== Writings ==
Kohlrausch published several textbooks, including the 1816 Die deutsche Geschichte für Schule und Haus ("German history for school and home"), a work that was published over fifteen editions. Other writings associated with Kohlrausch include:

- Die Geschichte und Lehre der Heiligen Schrift ("The history and teachings of Holy Scripture", 1811).
- Chronologischer Abriss der Weltgeschichte ("Chronological outline of world history"; 15th edition, 1861).
- Kurze Darstellung der deutschen Geschichte ("Brief account of German history"; 15th edition, 1894).
