= Charles R. Fox =

US general (1912-2006)

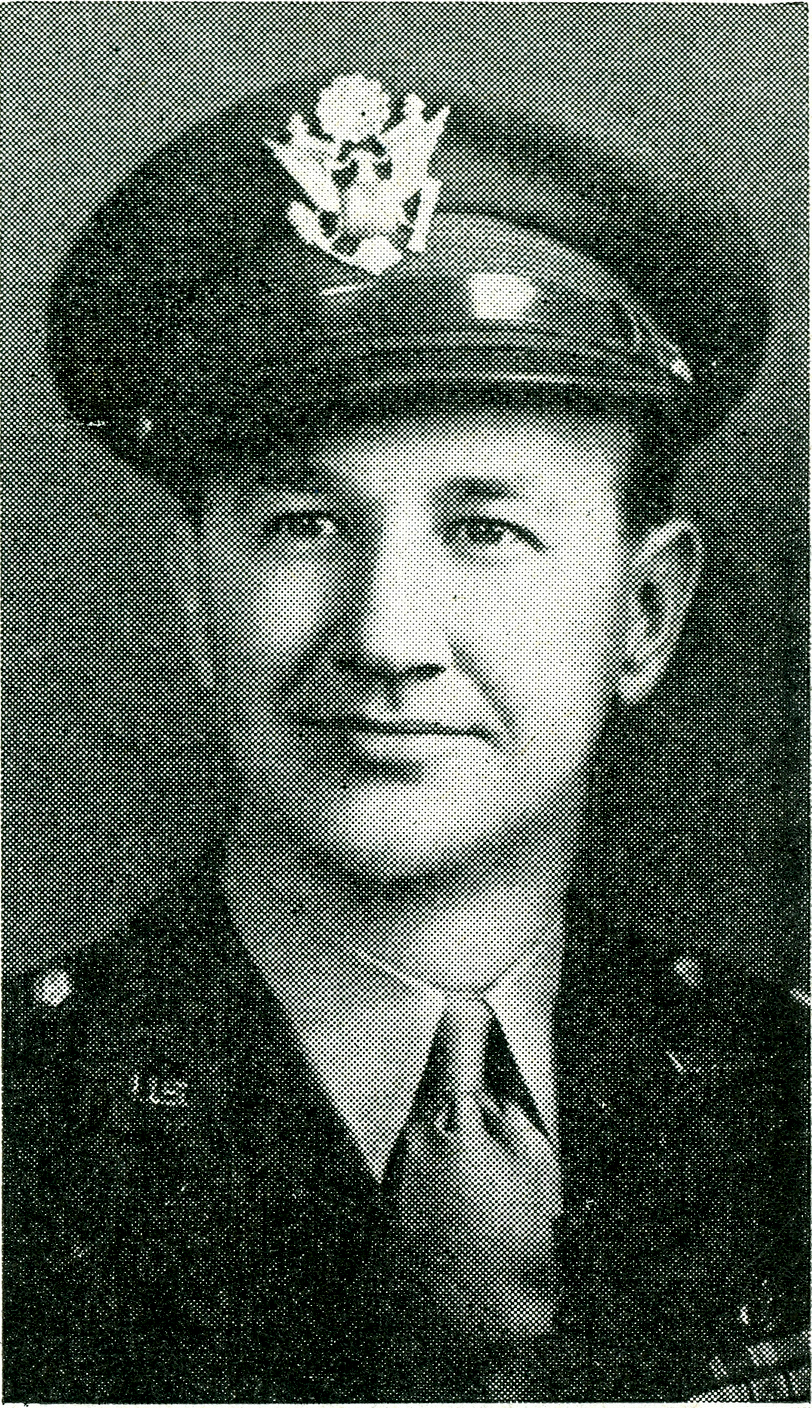
- Born: Charles Ralph Fox; November 16, 1912; Nicholas County, West Virginia
- Died: February 28, 2006 (aged 93)
- Military career
- Allegiance: United States
- Branch: United States Air Force
- Rank: Major General
- Commands: West Virginia National Guard

Charles Ralph Fox (November 16, 1912 – February 28, 2006) was an American Major General of West Virginia's National Guard.

Fox was born in Nicholas County, West Virginia, as son of Joseph B. and Amma (Walker) Fox. He enlisted in West Virginia National Guard in 1930, and was commissioned second lieutenant in 1936. He married Vernise Jane Pritt in 1935, and they had four children: Charles Warren, Janice Lynn, Roger Neill and Mark William. He studied electrical engineering by correspondence from International Correspondence Schools during 1934-38. He was promoted first lieutenant at the 150th Infantry in 1939, and in January 1941, he was called to active duty with the West Virginia National Guard.

He graduated from Air Corps Advanced Flying School in 1942, rated Aircraft Observer, and was transferred to Air Corps Reserve. During 1942, he advanced to major, and to lieutenant colonel in 1944. He served on staff of Major General Claire Lee Chennault of the Fourteenth Air Force in China for two years, and in the Headquarters Army Air Force in Washington for 14 months. He completed a special course in Nuclear Physics at Johns Hopkins University in 1946. He was appointed the Adjutant General of West Virginia with rank of brigadier general in 1946, a position he held to 1957. He was appointed State director of the Selective Service System in 1948, and appointed State Director of Civil Defense in 1949.
