= Friedrich Kohlrausch (physicist) =

German physicist and electrochemist (1840–1910)

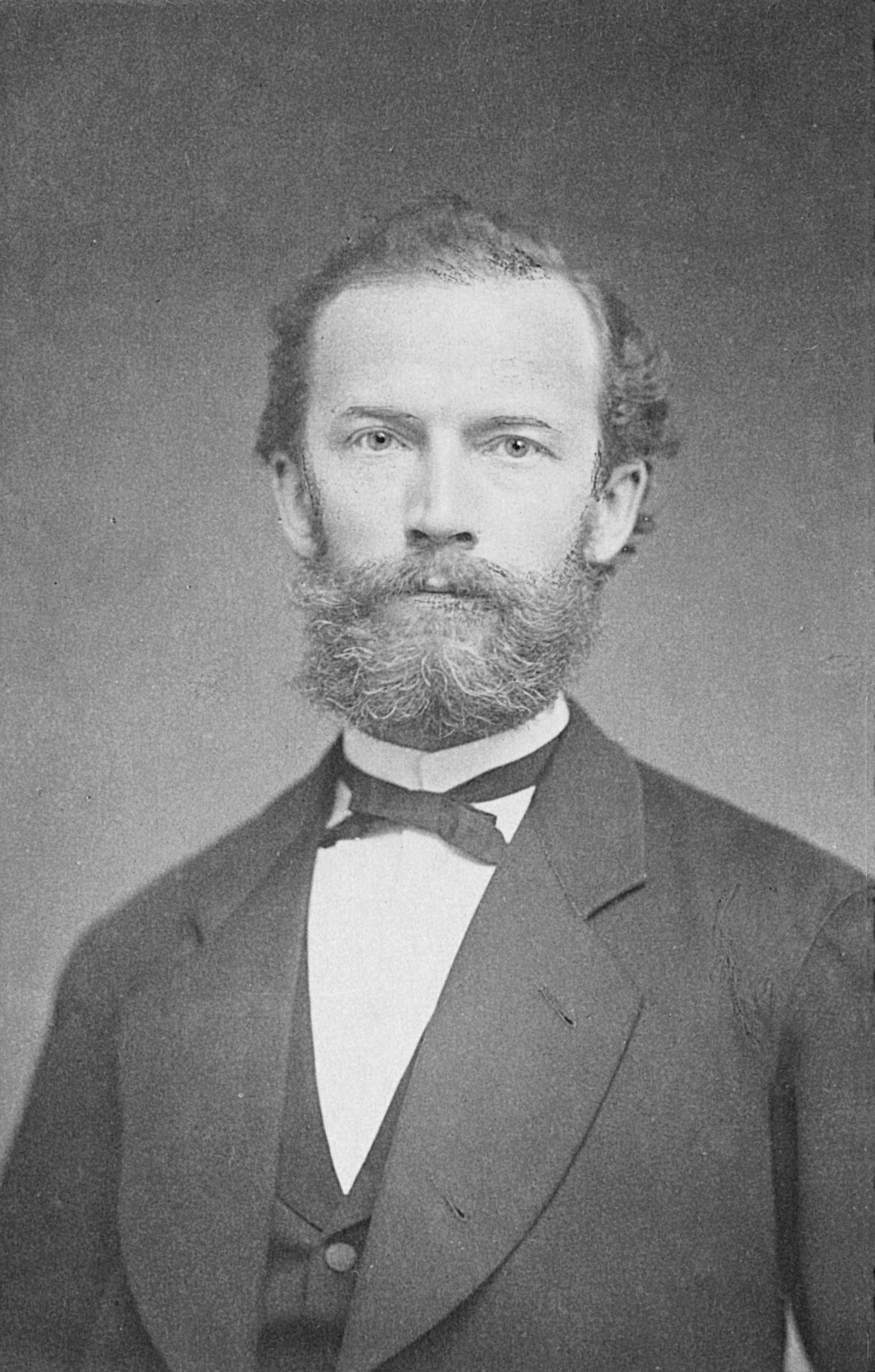
- Friedrich Wilhelm Georg Kohlrausch (1840–1910)
- Born: 14 October 1840; Rinteln
- Died: 17 January 1910 (aged 69); Marburg
- Education: University of Erlangen; University of Göttingen
- Known for: Work on electrolytes Conductometry; Kohlrausch bridge
- Awards: Pour le Mérite (1896); ForMemRS (1895)
- Scientific career
- Fields: Physicist
- Workplaces: University of Frankfurt/Main; University of Göttingen; ETH Zurich; Darmstadt University; University of Würzburg; Strasbourg University; Humboldt University
- Doctoral advisor: Wilhelm Eduard Weber
- Doctoral students: Walther Nernst; Erasmus Kittler
- Other notable students: Svante Arrhenius

Notes
- He was the son of Rudolf Kohlrausch, the grandson of Friedrich Kohlrausch, and the nephew of Otto Kohlrausch.

Friedrich Wilhelm Georg Kohlrausch (14 October 1840 – 17 January 1910) was a German physicist who investigated the conductive properties of electrolytes and contributed to knowledge of their behaviour. He also investigated elasticity, thermoelasticity, and thermal conduction as well as magnetic and electrical precision measurements.

Nowadays, Friedrich Kohlrausch is classed as one of the most important experimental physicists. His early work helped to extend the absolute system of Carl Friedrich Gauss and Wilhelm Weber to include electrical and magnetic measuring units.

== Biography ==
=== Education ===
Son of Rudolf Kohlrausch, Friedrich Wilhelm Georg Kohlrausch was born on October 14, 1840, in Rinteln, Germany. After studying physics at Erlangen and Göttingen, Friedrich Kohlrausch completed his doctorate in Göttingen.

=== Teaching ===
After a two-year work as a lecturer in Frankfurt, Kohlrausch was appointed a professor of physics at the University of Göttingen (1866–70). During 1870 Kohlrausch became a professor at ETH Zurich in Switzerland. One year later, he moved to the Darmstadt University of Technology in Germany.

In 1875, he responded to an offer from the University of Würzburg in southern Germany, where he subsequently conducted his experiments in quantity determination and the conductivity of electrolytes. From 1888 he researched and taught at Strasbourg University.

He refused a professorship at the Humboldt University in Berlin in 1894, but from 1900 he was also a professor there. He was elected an International Honorary Member of the American Academy of Arts and Sciences in 1900 and an International Member of the United States National Academy of Sciences in 1901. He was elected a member of the Royal Swedish Academy of Sciences during 1902. He was elected to the American Philosophical Society in 1909.

== Research work ==
Kohlrausch was an important researcher of electrochemistry for many reasons. First, the experiments from which he deduced his law of independent migration of ions became canonical and disseminated from Kohlrausch's laboratories in Göttingen, Zürich, and Darmstadt; Svante Arrhenius, Wilhelm Ostwald and Jacobus Henricus van 't Hoff, the original Ionists, all trained with methods and equipment of Kohlrauschian lineage. Moreover, because Kohlrausch also continued to test and confirm the Ionist theory after it had been first proposed, his work tied "measuring physics" and its consequent capability of producing plenty of empirical data to the results and methods of the Ionists and their devotees.

=== Electrolyte conductivity in solution ===
In 1874 he demonstrated that an electrolyte has a definite and constant amount of electrical resistance. By observing the dependence of conductivity upon dilution, he could determine the transfer velocities of the ions (charged atoms or molecules) in solution. He used alternating current to prevent the formation of electrolysis products (H_{2} and O_{2} gas evolution, or metal deposition); this enabled him to obtain very precise results.

From 1875 to 1879, he examined numerous salt solutions, acids and solutions of other materials. His efforts resulted in the law of the independent migration of ions, that is, each type of migrating ion has a specific limiting molar conductivity no matter what combination of ions are in solution, and therefore that a solution's electrical resistance is due only to the migrating ions of a given substances. Kohlrausch showed for weak (incompletely dissociated) electrolytes that the more dilute a solution, the greater its molar conductivity due to increased ionic dissociation.

=== Measuring techniques and instruments ===
During 1895 he succeeded Hermann von Helmholtz as President of the Physikalisch-Technische Reichsanstalt (PTR – Imperial Physical Technical Institute), an office which he held until 1905.

Here, as in the past, his activities were focused on experimental and instrumental physics: he constructed instruments and devised new measuring techniques to examine electrolytic conduction in solutions. He concluded the setup of the PTR, a task which had not yet been completed on the death of its first president. He introduced fixed regulations, work schedules and working hours for the Institute.

Under direction of Kohlrausch, the PTR created numerous standards and calibration standards which were also used internationally outside Germany.

Kohlrausch was intent on creating optimum working conditions in the laboratories and to shield the labs from unwanted external influences. For six years, for instance, he fought against a streetcar line which was due to be laid near the PTR. However, before the streetcar was to make its first journey, the institute succeeded in developing an astatic torsion magnetometer which was uninfluenced by disturbing electromagnetic fields. The use of this instrument and the shielded wire galvanometer developed by du Bois and Rubens meant that precision electrical and magnetic work continued to be possible.

Over the years, Kohlrausch added experiments which met the needs of physical chemistry and electrical technology in particular. He improved precision measuring instruments and developed numerous measuring methods in almost all of the fields of physics known during his lifetime, including a reflectivity meter, a tangent galvanometer, and various types of magnetometers and dynamometers. The Kohlrausch bridge, which he invented at that time for the purpose of measuring conductivity, is still well known today. Like Helmholtz and Siemens, Kohlrausch also saw the possibilities inherent in applied and basic research in the natural sciences and technology. He lay the foundations for scientific knowledge which promoted and advanced industry and technology. The PTR developed standardized precision instruments for university research institutes and industrial laboratories. It introduced uniform electrical units for Germany and also played a significant role in their international usage. In the period to 1905, there were many examples of the importance of the PTR for German industry, in particular for the high technologies of the time – the electrical, optical and mechanical industries.

Overall, Kohlrausch was involved in the measurement of electrical, magnetic and electrochemical phenomena for almost 50 years. In 1905 Kohlrausch retired from his post as President of the PTR.

Friedrich Kohlrausch died in Marburg on 17 January 1910 at the age of 69.

=== Writings ===
In the University of Göttingen, Kohlrausch documented his practical experiments resulting in the book Leitfaden der praktischen Physik (Guidelines to Practical Physics), which was published in 1870 as the first book of its type in Germany. It contained not only descriptions of experiments, experimental setups and measuring techniques, but also tables of physical quantities. It was issued in many editions (the 9th enlarged and revised edition of 1901 being entitled Lehrbuch der praktischen Physik; a more elementary work based on it being entitled Kleiner Leitfaden der praktischen Physik) and translated into English. It was considered the standard work on physical laboratory methods and measurements.

To this day, the textbook Praktische Physik (Practical Physics), which originated in Kohlrausch's Leitfaden der praktischen Physik, is standard reading for physicists and engineers in Germany. This is attributable, above all, to the detailed descriptions provided of the measuring methods that form the basis of technical and experimental applications in many fields in physics.

Kohlrausch was also the author of Ueber den absoluten Leitungswiderstand des Quecksilbers (On the electrical resistance of mercury, 1888), and of many papers contributed to the Annalen der Physik und Chemie, and other scientific journals.

=== List of works ===
- Leitfaden der praktischen Physik (in German). Leipzig: Benedictus Gotthelf Teubner. 1892.
- Leitvermögen der Elektrolyte (in German). Leipzig: Benedictus Gotthelf Teubner. 1898.
