= Fox–Wright function =

Generalisation of the generalised hypergeometric function pFq(z)

In mathematics, the Fox–Wright function (also known as Fox–Wright Psi function, not to be confused with Wright Omega function) is a generalisation of the generalised hypergeometric function _{p}F_{q}(z) based on ideas of Charles Fox (1928) and E. Maitland Wright (1935):

$${}_p\Psi_q \left[\begin{matrix}
( a_1 , A_1 ) & ( a_2 , A_2 ) & \ldots & ( a_p , A_p ) \\
( b_1 , B_1 ) & ( b_2 , B_2 ) & \ldots & ( b_q , B_q ) \end{matrix}
; z \right]
=
\sum_{n=0}^\infty \frac{\Gamma( a_1 + A_1 n )\cdots\Gamma( a_p + A_p n )}{\Gamma( b_1 + B_1 n )\cdots\Gamma( b_q + B_q n )} \, \frac {z^n} {n!}.$$

Upon changing the normalisation

$${}_p\Psi^*_q \left[\begin{matrix}
( a_1 , A_1 ) & ( a_2 , A_2 ) & \ldots & ( a_p , A_p ) \\
( b_1 , B_1 ) & ( b_2 , B_2 ) & \ldots & ( b_q , B_q ) \end{matrix}
; z \right]
=
\frac{ \Gamma(b_1) \cdots \Gamma(b_q) }{ \Gamma(a_1) \cdots \Gamma(a_p) }
\sum_{n=0}^\infty \frac{\Gamma( a_1 + A_1 n )\cdots\Gamma( a_p + A_p n )}{\Gamma( b_1 + B_1 n )\cdots\Gamma( b_q + B_q n )} \, \frac {z^n} {n!}$$

it becomes _{p}F_{q}(z) for A_{1...p} = B_{1...q} = 1.

The Fox–Wright function is a special case of the Fox H-function (Srivastava & Manocha 1984, p. 50):

$${}_p\Psi_q \left[\begin{matrix}
( a_1 , A_1 ) & ( a_2 , A_2 ) & \ldots & ( a_p , A_p ) \\
( b_1 , B_1 ) & ( b_2 , B_2 ) & \ldots & ( b_q , B_q ) \end{matrix}
; z \right]
=
H^{1,p}_{p,q+1} \left[ -z \left| \begin{matrix}
( 1-a_1 , A_1 ) & ( 1-a_2 , A_2 ) & \ldots & ( 1-a_p , A_p ) \\
(0,1) & (1- b_1 , B_1 ) & ( 1-b_2 , B_2 ) & \ldots & ( 1-b_q , B_q ) \end{matrix} \right. \right].$$

== Wright function ==
The entire function $W_{\lambda,\mu}(z)$ is often called the Wright function. It is the special case of ${}_0\Psi_1 \left[\ldots \right]$ of the Fox–Wright function. Its series representation is

$$W_{\lambda,\mu}(z) = \sum_{n=0}^\infty
\frac{z^n}{n!\,\Gamma(\lambda n+\mu)}, \lambda > -1.$$

This function is used extensively in fractional calculus. Recall that $\lim\limits_{\lambda \to 0} W_{\lambda,\mu}(z) = e^{z} / \Gamma(\mu)$. Hence, a non-zero $\lambda$ with zero $\mu$ is the simplest nontrivial extension of the exponential function in such context.

Three properties were stated in Theorem 1 of Wright (1933) and 18.1(30–32) of Erdelyi, Bateman Project, Vol 3 (1955) (p. 212)

$$\begin{align}
\lambda z W_{\lambda,\mu+\lambda}(z) & = W_{\lambda,\mu -1}(z) + (1-\mu) W_{\lambda,\mu}(z)
& (a) \\[6pt]
{d \over dz} W_{\lambda,\mu }(z) & = W_{\lambda,\mu +\lambda}(z)
& (b) \\[6pt]
\lambda z {d \over dz} W_{\lambda,\mu }(z) & = W_{\lambda,\mu -1}(z) + (1-\mu) W_{\lambda,\mu}(z)
& (c)
\end{align}$$

Equation (a) is a recurrence formula. (b) and (c) provide two paths to reduce a derivative. And (c) can be derived from (a) and (b).

A special case of (c) is $\lambda = -c\alpha, \mu = 0$. Replacing $z$ with $-x^\alpha$, we have

$$\begin{array}{lcl}
x {d \over dx} W_{-c\alpha,0 }(-x^\alpha) & = &
-\frac{1}{c}
\left[ W_{-c\alpha,-1}(-x^\alpha) + W_{-c\alpha,0}(-x^\alpha) \right]
\end{array}$$

A special case of (a) is $\lambda = -\alpha, \mu = 1$. Replacing $z$ with $-z$, we have
$$\alpha z W_{-\alpha,1-\alpha}(-z) = W_{-\alpha,0}(-z)$$

Two notations, $M_{\alpha}(z)$ and $F_{\alpha}(z)$, were used extensively in the literatures:

$$\begin{align}
M_{\alpha}(z) & = W_{-\alpha,1-\alpha}(-z), \\ [1ex]
\implies
F_{\alpha}(z) & = W_{-\alpha,0}(-z) = \alpha z M_{\alpha}(z).
\end{align}$$

=== M-Wright function ===
$M_\alpha(z)$ is known as the M-Wright function, entering as a probability density in a relevant class of self-similar stochastic processes, generally referred to as time-fractional diffusion processes.

Its properties were surveyed in Mainardi et al (2010).

Its asymptotic expansion of $M_{\alpha}(z)$ for $\alpha > 0$ is
$$M_\alpha \left ( \frac{r}{\alpha} \right ) =
A(\alpha) \, r^{(\alpha -1/2)/(1-\alpha)}
\, e^{-B(\alpha) \, r^{1/(1-\alpha)}}, \,\, r\rightarrow \infty,$$
where $A(\alpha) = \frac{1}{\sqrt{2\pi (1-\alpha)}},$ $B(\alpha) = \frac{1-\alpha}{\alpha}.$

== See also ==
- Prabhakar function
- Hypergeometric function
- Generalized hypergeometric function
