= GENLN2 =

GENLN2 is suite of software programs that provide a general purpose line by line atmospheric transmittance and radiance model.

== See also ==
- List of atmospheric radiative transfer codes
- Atmospheric radiative transfer codes
- Absorption spectrum
- MODTRAN
- HITRAN
