= CRTM =

CRTM may refer to:

- 4,4'-Diapophytoene synthase, an enzyme
- Community Radiative Transfer Model, a fast radiative transfer model
- Consorcio Regional de Transportes de Madrid, a group of regional transit operators in Madrid, Spain
- Core Root of Trust Measurement, the measurements of Authenticated Code Module and BIOS code in the Trusted Execution Technology in computing
