= Outgoing longwave radiation =

Energy transfer mechanism which enables planetary cooling

Spectral intensity of sunlight (average at top of atmosphere) and thermal radiation emitted by Earth's surface.

In climate science, longwave radiation (LWR) is electromagnetic thermal radiation emitted by Earth's surface, atmosphere, and clouds. It is also referred to as terrestrial radiation. This radiation is in the infrared portion of the spectrum, but is distinct from the shortwave (SW) near-infrared radiation found in sunlight.

Outgoing longwave radiation (OLR) is the longwave radiation emitted to space from the top of Earth's atmosphere. It may also be referred to as emitted terrestrial radiation. Outgoing longwave radiation plays an important role in planetary cooling.

Longwave radiation generally spans wavelengths ranging from 3–100 micrometres (μm). A cutoff of 4 μm is sometimes used to differentiate sunlight from longwave radiation. Less than 1% of sunlight has wavelengths greater than 4 μm. Over 99% of outgoing longwave radiation has wavelengths between 4 μm and 100 μm.

The flux of energy transported by outgoing longwave radiation is typically measured in units of watts per metre squared (W⋅m^{−2}). In the case of global energy flux, the W/m^{2} value is obtained by dividing the total energy flow over the surface of the globe (measured in watts) by the surface area of the Earth, 5.1×10^{14} m^{2} (5.1×10^{8} km^{2}; 2.0×10^{8} mi^{2}).

Emitting outgoing longwave radiation is the only way Earth loses energy to space, i.e., the only way the planet cools itself. Radiative heating from absorbed sunlight, and radiative cooling to space via OLR power the heat engine that drives atmospheric dynamics.

The balance between OLR (energy lost) and incoming solar shortwave radiation (energy gained) determines whether the Earth is experiencing global heating or cooling (see Earth's energy budget).

== Planetary energy balance ==
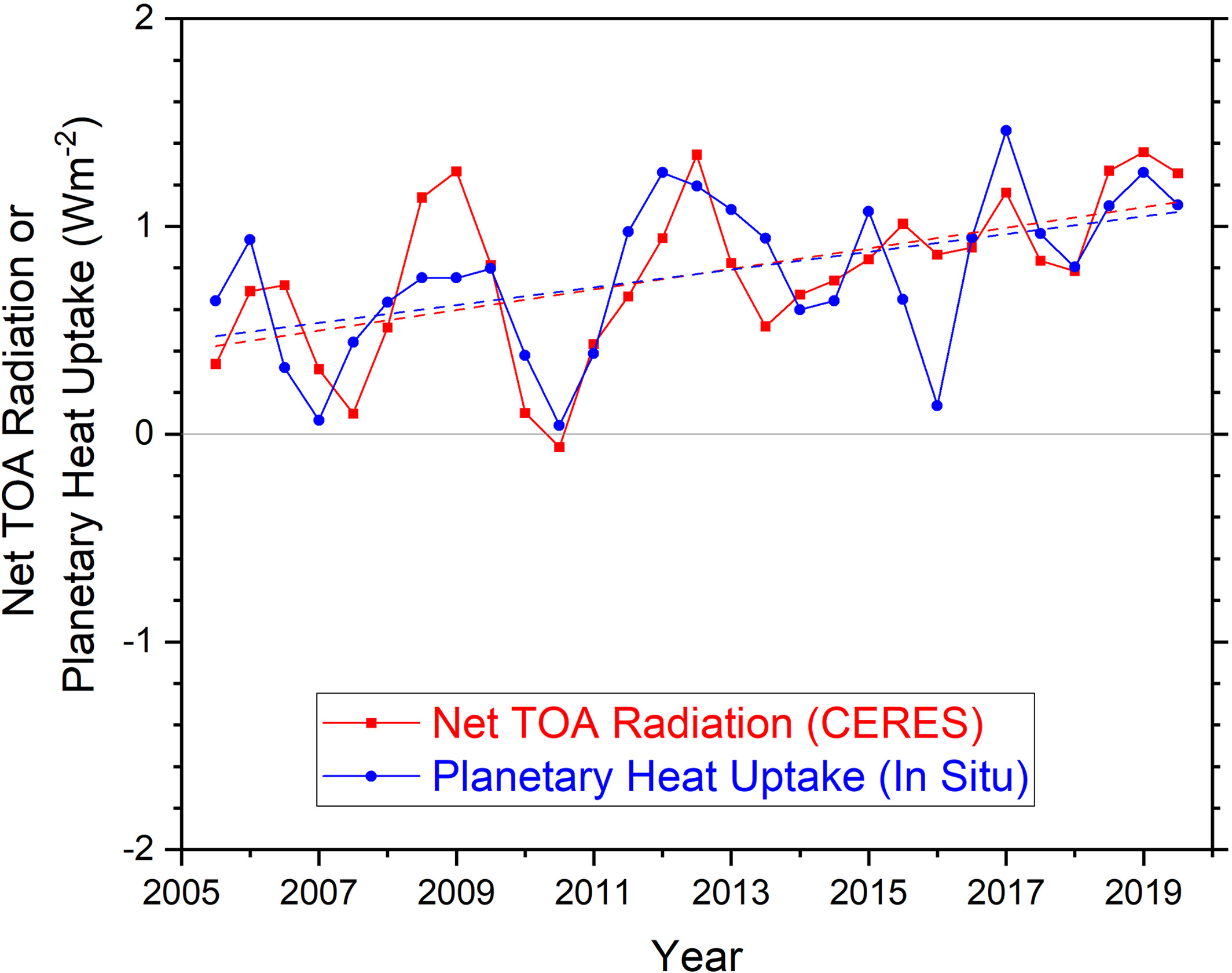
The growth in Earth's energy imbalance from satellite and in situ measurements (2005–2019). A rate of +1.0 W/m^{2} summed over the planet's surface equates to a continuous heat uptake of about 500 terawatts (~0.3% of the incident solar radiation).

Outgoing longwave radiation (OLR) constitutes a critical component of Earth's energy budget.

The principle of conservation of energy says that energy cannot appear or disappear. Thus, any energy that enters a system but does not leave must be retained within the system. So, the amount of energy retained on Earth (in Earth's climate system) is governed by an equation:

[change in Earth's energy] = [energy arriving] − [energy leaving].

Energy arrives in the form of absorbed solar radiation (ASR). Energy leaves as outgoing longwave radiation (OLR). Thus, the rate of change in the energy in Earth's climate system is given by Earth's energy imbalance (EEI):

$$\mathrm{EEI} = \mathrm{ASR} - \mathrm{OLR}$$.

When energy is arriving at a higher rate than it leaves (i.e., ASR > OLR, so that EEI is positive), the amount of energy in Earth's climate increases. Temperature is a measure of the amount of thermal energy in matter. So, under these circumstances, temperatures tend to increase overall (though temperatures might decrease in some places as the distribution of energy changes). As temperatures increase, the amount of thermal radiation emitted also increases, leading to more outgoing longwave radiation (OLR), and a smaller energy imbalance (EEI).

Similarly, if energy arrives at a lower rate than it leaves (i.e., ASR < OLR, so than EEI is negative), the amount of energy in Earth's climate decreases, and temperatures tend to decrease overall. As temperatures decrease, OLR decreases, making the imbalance closer to zero.

In this fashion, a planet naturally constantly adjusts its temperature so as to keep the energy imbalance small. If there is more solar radiation absorbed than OLR emitted, the planet will heat up. If there is more OLR than absorbed solar radiation the planet will cool. In both cases, the temperature change works to shift the energy imbalance towards zero. When the energy imbalance is zero, a planet is said to be in radiative equilibrium. Planets naturally tend to a state of approximate radiative equilibrium.

In recent decades, energy has been measured to be arriving on Earth at a higher rate than it leaves, corresponding to planetary warming. The energy imbalance has been increasing. It can take decades to centuries for oceans to warm and planetary temperature to shift sufficiently to compensate for an energy imbalance.

== Emission ==
Thermal radiation is emitted by nearly all matter, in proportion to the fourth power of its absolute temperature.

In particular, the emitted energy flux, $M$ (measured in W/m^{2}) is given by the Stefan–Boltzmann law for non-blackbody matter:

$$M = \epsilon\, \sigma\, T^4$$

where $T$ is the absolute temperature, $\sigma$ is the Stefan–Boltzmann constant, and $\epsilon$ is the emissivity. The emissivity is a value between zero and one which indicates how much less radiation is emitted compared to what a perfect blackbody would emit.

=== Surface ===
The emissivity of Earth's surface has been measured to be in the range 0.65 to 0.99 (based on observations in the 8-13 micron wavelength range) with the lowest values being for barren desert regions. The emissivity is mostly above 0.9, and the global average surface emissivity is estimated to be around 0.95.

=== Atmosphere ===
The most common gases in air (i.e., nitrogen, oxygen, and argon) have a negligible ability to absorb or emit longwave thermal radiation. Consequently, the ability of air to absorb and emit longwave radiation is determined by the concentration of trace gases like water vapor and carbon dioxide.

According to Kirchhoff's law of thermal radiation, the emissivity of matter is always equal to its absorptivity, at a given wavelength. At some wavelengths, greenhouse gases absorb 100% of the longwave radiation emitted by the surface. So, at those wavelengths, the emissivity of the atmosphere is 1 and the atmosphere emits thermal radiation much like an ideal blackbody would. However, this applies only at wavelengths where the atmosphere fully absorbs longwave radiation.

Although greenhouse gases in air have a high emissivity at some wavelengths, this does not necessarily correspond to a high rate of thermal radiation being emitted to space. This is because the atmosphere is generally much colder than the surface, and the rate at which longwave radiation is emitted scales as the fourth power of temperature. Thus, the higher the altitude at which longwave radiation is emitted, the lower its intensity.

== Atmospheric absorption ==
The atmosphere is relatively transparent to solar radiation, but it is nearly opaque to longwave radiation. The atmosphere typically absorbs most of the longwave radiation emitted by the surface. Absorption of longwave radiation prevents that radiation from reaching space.

At wavelengths where the atmosphere absorbs surface radiation, some portion of the radiation that was absorbed is replaced by a lesser amount of thermal radiation emitted by the atmosphere at a higher altitude.

When absorbed, the energy transmitted by this radiation is transferred to the substance that absorbed it. However, overall, greenhouse gases in the troposphere emit more thermal radiation than they absorb, so longwave radiative heat transfer has a net cooling effect on air.

=== Atmospheric window ===
Assuming no cloud cover, most of the surface emissions that reach space do so through the atmospheric window. The atmospheric window is a region of the electromagnetic wavelength spectrum between 8 and 11 μm where the atmosphere does not absorb longwave radiation (except for the ozone band between 9.6 and 9.8 μm).

=== Gases ===
Greenhouse gases in the atmosphere are responsible for a majority of the absorption of longwave radiation in the atmosphere. The most important of these gases are water vapor, carbon dioxide, methane, and ozone.

The absorption of longwave radiation by gases depends on the specific absorption bands of the gases in the atmosphere. The specific absorption bands are determined by their molecular structure and energy levels. Each type of greenhouse gas has a unique group of absorption bands that correspond to particular wavelengths of radiation that the gas can absorb.

=== Clouds ===
The OLR balance is affected by clouds, dust, and aerosols in the atmosphere. Clouds tend to block penetration of upwelling longwave radiation, causing a lower flux of long-wave radiation penetrating to higher altitudes. Clouds are effective at absorbing and scattering longwave radiation, and therefore reduce the amount of outgoing longwave radiation.

Clouds have both cooling and warming effects. They have a cooling effect insofar as they reflect sunlight (as measured by cloud albedo), and a warming effect, insofar as they absorb longwave radiation. For low clouds, the reflection of solar radiation is the larger effect; so, these clouds cool the Earth. In contrast, for high thin clouds in cold air, the absorption of longwave radiation is the more significant effect; so these clouds warm the planet.

=== Details ===
The interaction between emitted longwave radiation and the atmosphere is complicated due to the factors that affect absorption. The path of the radiation in the atmosphere also determines radiative absorption: longer paths through the atmosphere result in greater absorption because of the cumulative absorption by many layers of gas. Lastly, the temperature and altitude of the absorbing gas also affect its absorption of longwave radiation.

OLR is affected by Earth's surface skin temperature (i.e, the temperature of the top layer of the surface), skin surface emissivity, atmospheric temperature, water vapor profile, and cloud cover.

== Day and night ==
The net all-wave radiation is dominated by longwave radiation during the night and in the polar regions. While there is no absorbed solar radiation during the night, terrestrial radiation continues to be emitted, primarily as a result of solar energy absorbed during the day.

== Relationship to greenhouse effect ==
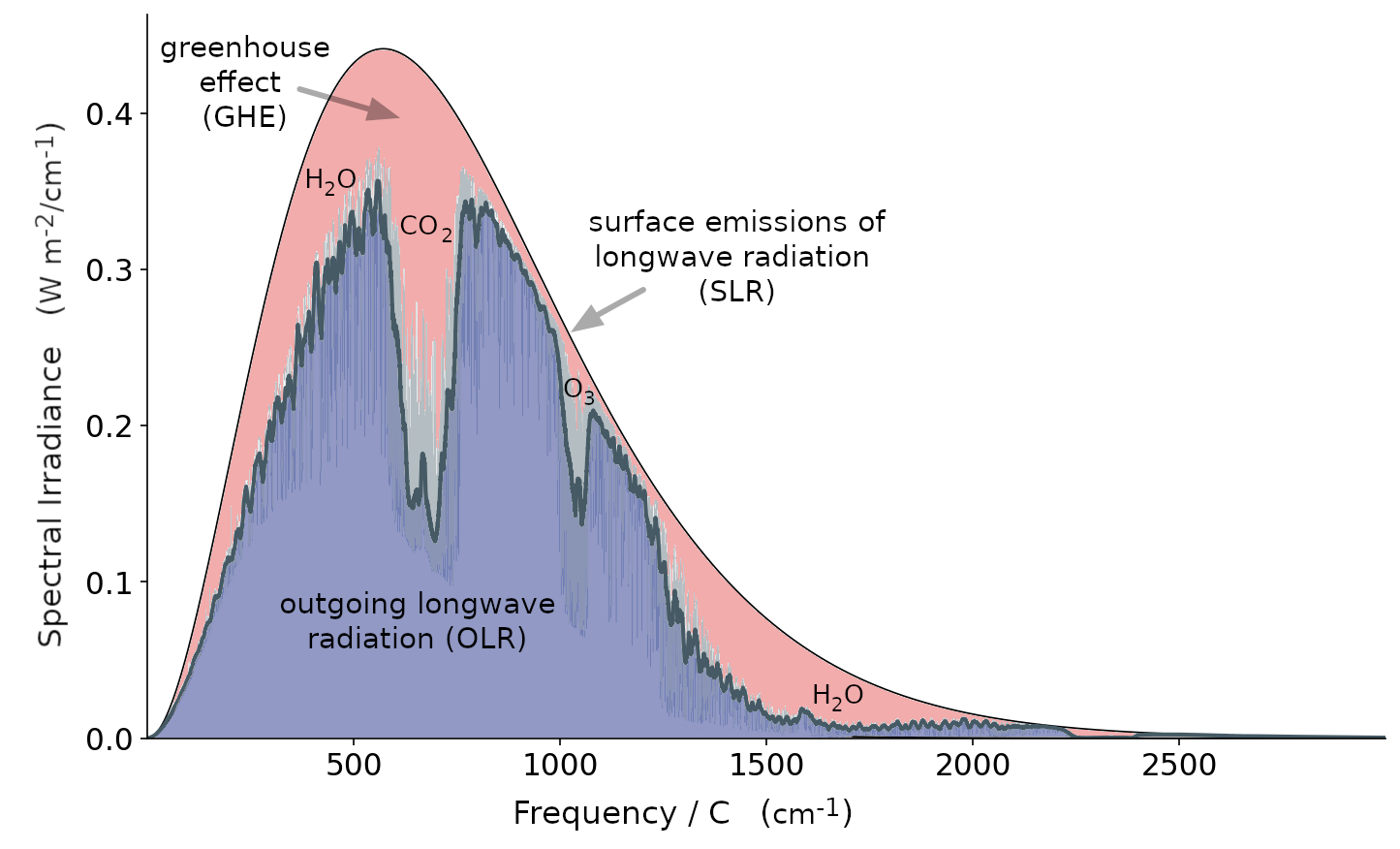
Outgoing radiation and greenhouse effect as a function of frequency. The greenhouse effect is visible as the area of the upper red area, and the greenhouse effect associated with CO_{2} is directly visible as the large dip near the center of the OLR spectrum.

The reduction of the outgoing longwave radiation (OLR), relative to longwave radiation emitted by the surface, is at the heart of the greenhouse effect.

More specifically, the greenhouse effect may be defined quantitatively as the amount of longwave radiation emitted by the surface that does not reach space. On Earth as of 2015, about 398 W/m^{2} of longwave radiation was emitted by the surface, while OLR, the amount reaching space, was 239 W/m^{2}. Thus, the greenhouse effect was 398−239 = 159 W/m^{2}, or 159/398 = 40% of surface emissions, not reaching space.

=== Effect of increasing greenhouse gases ===
When the concentration of a greenhouse gas (such as carbon dioxide (CO_{2}), methane (CH_{4}), nitrous oxide (N_{2}O), and water vapor (H_{2}O) and is increased, this has a number of effects. At a given wavelength

- the fraction of surface emissions that are absorbed is increased, decreasing OLR (unless 100% of surface emissions at that wavelength are already being absorbed);
- the altitude from which the atmosphere emits that that wavelength to space increases (since the altitude at which the atmosphere becomes transparent to that wavelength increases); if the emission altitude is within the troposphere, the temperature of the emitting air will be lower, which will result in a reduction in OLR at that wavelength.

The size of the reduction in OLR will vary by wavelength. Even if OLR does not decrease at certain wavelengths (e.g., because 100% of surface emissions are absorbed and the emission altitude is in the stratosphere), increased greenhouse gas concentration can still lead to significant reductions in OLR at other wavelengths where absorption is weaker.

When OLR decreases, this leads to an energy imbalance, with energy received being greater than energy lost, causing a warming effect. Therefore, an increase in the concentrations of greenhouse gases causes energy to accumulate in Earth's climate system, contributing to global warming.

=== Surface budget fallacy ===
If the absorptivity of the gas is high and the gas is present in a high enough concentration, the absorption at certain wavelengths becomes saturated. This means there is enough gas present to completely absorb the radiated energy at that wavelength before the upper atmosphere is reached.

It is sometimes incorrectly argued that this means an increase in the concentration of this gas will have no additional effect on the planet's energy budget. This argument neglects the fact that outgoing longwave radiation is determined not only by the amount of surface radiation that is absorbed, but also by the altitude (and temperature) at which longwave radiation is emitted to space. Even if 100% of surface emissions are absorbed at a given wavelength, the OLR at that wavelength can still be reduced by increased greenhouse gas concentration, since the increased concentration leads to the atmosphere emitting longwave radiation to space from a higher altitude. If the air at that higher altitude is colder (as is true throughout the troposphere), then thermal emissions to space will be reduced, decreasing OLR.

False conclusions about the implications of absorption being "saturated" are examples of the surface budget fallacy, i.e., erroneous reasoning that results from focusing on energy exchange at the surface, instead of focusing on the top-of-atmosphere (TOA) energy balance.

== Measurements ==
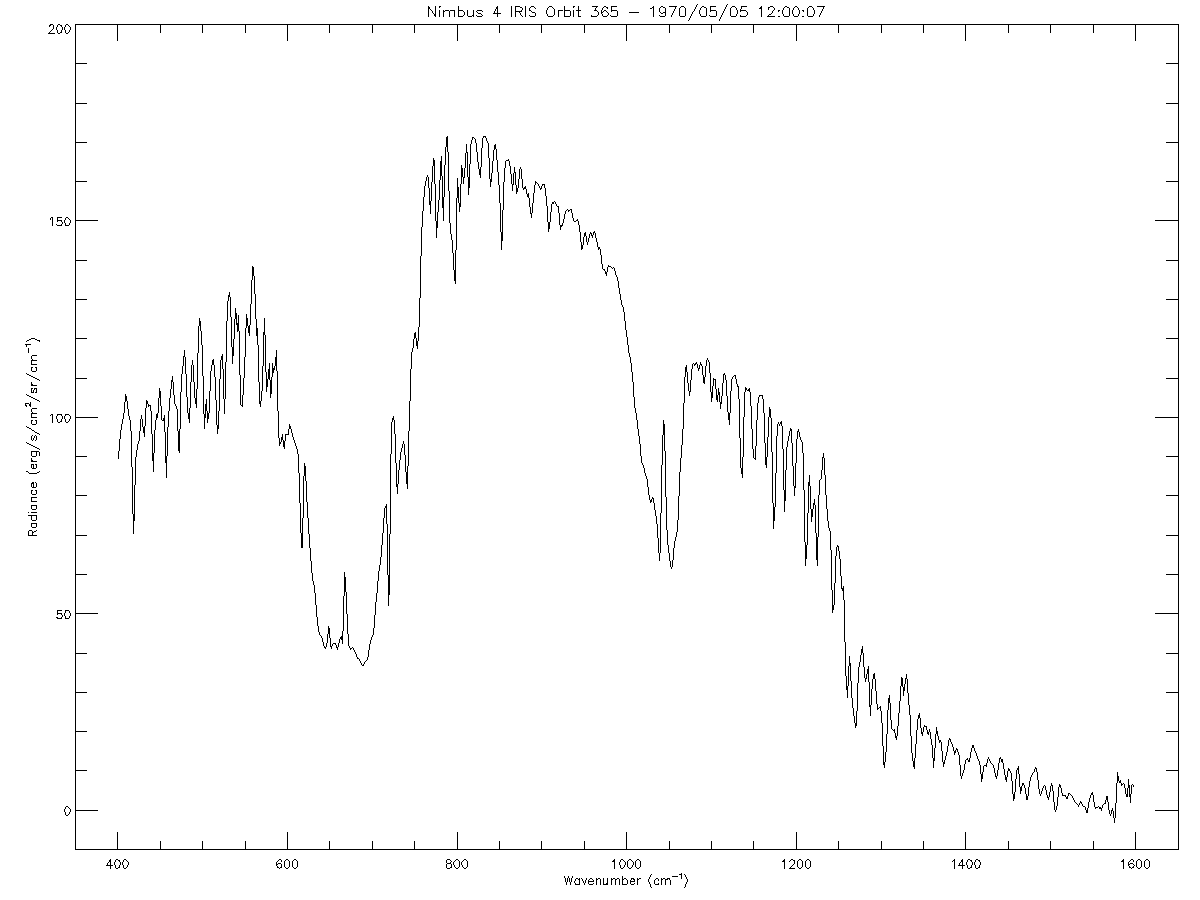
Example wavenumber spectrum of Earth's infrared emissions (400-1600 cm^{−1}) measured by IRIS on Nimbus 4 in year 1970.

Measurements of outgoing longwave radiation at the top of the atmosphere and of longwave radiation back towards the surface are important to understand how much energy is retained in Earth's climate system: for example, how thermal radiation cools and warms the surface, and how this energy is distributed to affect the development of clouds. Observing this radiative flux from a surface also provides a practical way of assessing surface temperatures on both local and global scales. This energy distribution is what drives atmospheric thermodynamics.

=== OLR ===
Outgoing long-wave radiation (OLR) has been monitored and reported since 1970 by a progression of satellite missions and instruments.

- Earliest observations were with infrared interferometer spectrometer and radiometer (IRIS) instruments developed for the Nimbus program and deployed on Nimbus-3 and Nimbus-4. These Michelson interferometers were designed to span wavelengths of 5 to 25 μm.
- Improved measurements were obtained starting with the Earth Radiation Balance (ERB) instruments on Nimbus-6 and Nimbus-7.
- These were followed by the Earth Radiation Budget Experiment scanners and the non scanner on NOAA-9, NOAA-10 and Earth Radiation Budget Satellite; also, the Clouds and the Earth's Radiant Energy System instruments aboard Aqua, Terra, Suomi-NPP and NOAA-20, and the Geostationary Earth Radiation Budget instrument (GERB) instrument on the Meteosat Second Generation (MSG) satellite.

=== Surface LW radiation ===
Longwave radiation at the surface (both outward and inward) is mainly measured by pyrgeometers. A most notable ground-based network for monitoring surface long-wave radiation is the Baseline Surface Radiation Network (BSRN), which provides crucial well-calibrated measurements for studying global dimming and brightening.

=== Data ===
Data on surface longwave radiation and OLR is available from a number of sources including:

- NASA GEWEX Surface Radiation Budget (1983-2007)
- NASA Clouds and the Earth's Radiant Energy System (CERES) project (2000-2022)

== OLR calculation and simulation ==
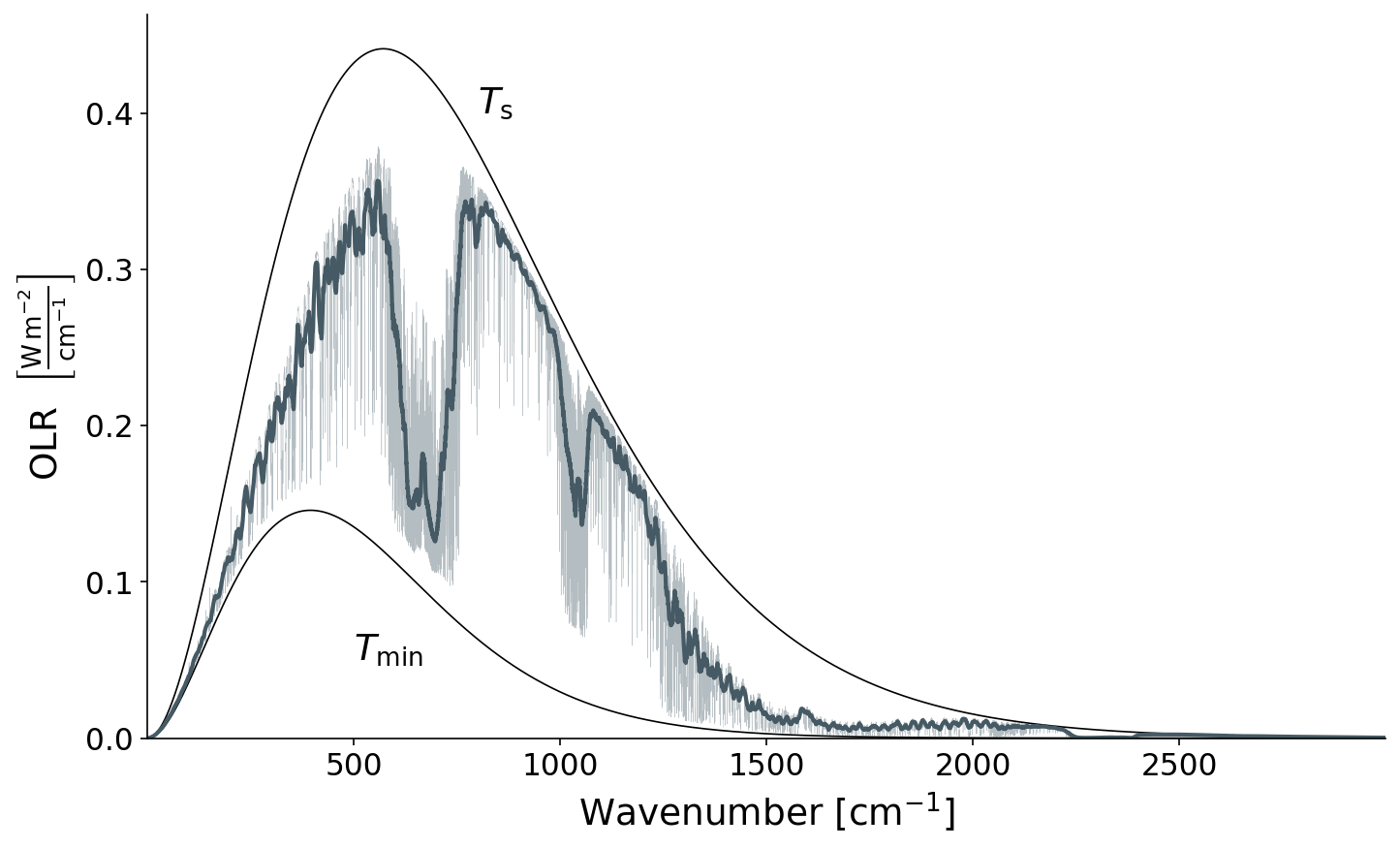
Simulated wavenumber spectrum of the Earth's outgoing longwave radiation (OLR) using ARTS. In addition the black-body radiation for a body at surface temperature T_{s} and at tropopause temperature T_{min} is shown.

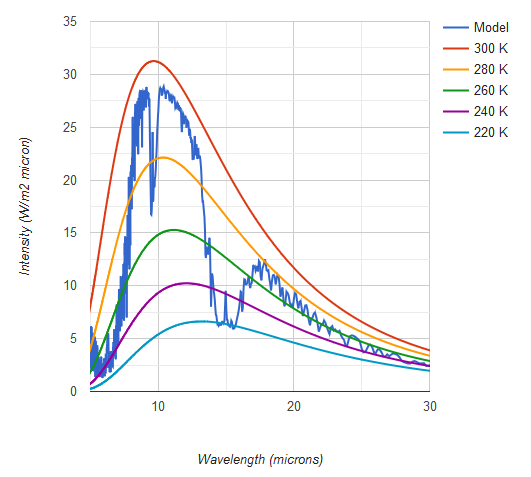
Simulated wavelength spectrum of Earth's OLR under clear-sky conditions using MODTRAN.

Many applications call for calculation of long-wave radiation quantities. Local radiative cooling by outgoing longwave radiation, suppression of radiative cooling (by downwelling longwave radiation cancelling out energy transfer by upwelling longwave radiation), and radiative heating through incoming solar radiation drive the temperature and dynamics of different parts of the atmosphere.

By using the radiance measured from a particular direction by an instrument, atmospheric properties (like temperature or humidity) can be inversely inferred. Calculations of these quantities solve the radiative transfer equations that describe radiation in the atmosphere. Usually the solution is done numerically by atmospheric radiative transfer codes adapted to the specific problem.

Another common approach is to estimate values using surface temperature and emissivity, then compare to satellite top-of-atmosphere radiance or brightness temperature.

There are online interactive tools that allow one to see the spectrum of outgoing longwave radiation that is predicted to reach space under various atmospheric conditions.

== See also ==
- Effective temperature
- Satellite temperature measurement
- Shortwave radiation
