= LBLRTM =

Radiation transfer model

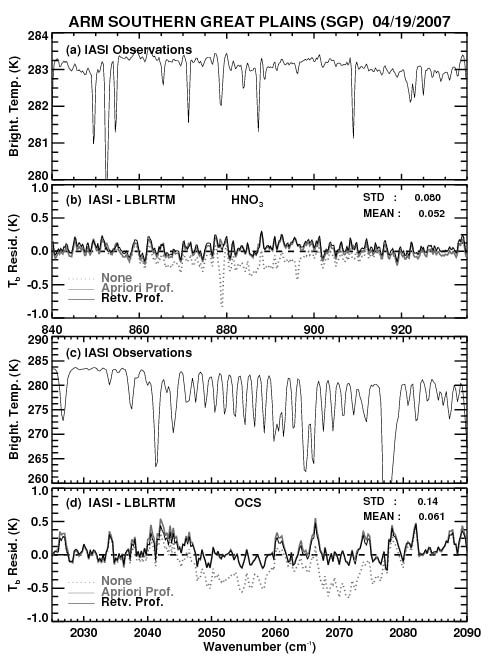
Brightness temperature observations and residuals (IASI- LBLRTM) for the ARM SGP case for the HNO3 (a, b) and the OCS (c, d) spectral regions

Within atmospheric science, LBLRTM - The Line-By-Line Radiative Transfer Model is an accurate, efficient and highly flexible model for calculating spectral transmittance and radiance.

== See also ==
- List of atmospheric radiative transfer codes
- Atmospheric radiative transfer codes
- Absorption spectrum
- HITRAN
