= DISORT =

DISORT (Discrete Ordinates Radiative Transfer Program for a Multi-Layered Plane-Parallel Medium) - general and versatile plane-parallel radiative transfer program applicable to problems from the ultraviolet to the radar regions of the electromagnetic spectrum.

DISORT is used in many atmospheric radiative transfer codes including Streamer, MODTRAN, RRTM and SBDART.

== See also ==
- List of atmospheric radiative transfer codes
- Atmospheric radiative transfer codes
- MODTRAN
- Streamer: A Radiative Transfer Model
- Rapid radiative transfer model
