= Simple Model of the Atmospheric Radiative Transfer of Sunshine =

The Simple Model of the Atmospheric Radiative Transfer of Sunshine (SMARTS) is a computer program designed to evaluate the surface solar irradiance components in the shortwave spectrum (spectral range 280 to 4000 nm) under cloudless conditions. The program, written in FORTRAN, relies on simplifications of the equation of radiative transfer to allow extremely fast calculations of the surface irradiance. The irradiance components can be incident on a horizontal, a fixed-tilt or a 2-axis tracking surface. SMARTS can be used for example to evaluate the energy production of solar panels under variable atmospheric conditions. Many other applications are possible.

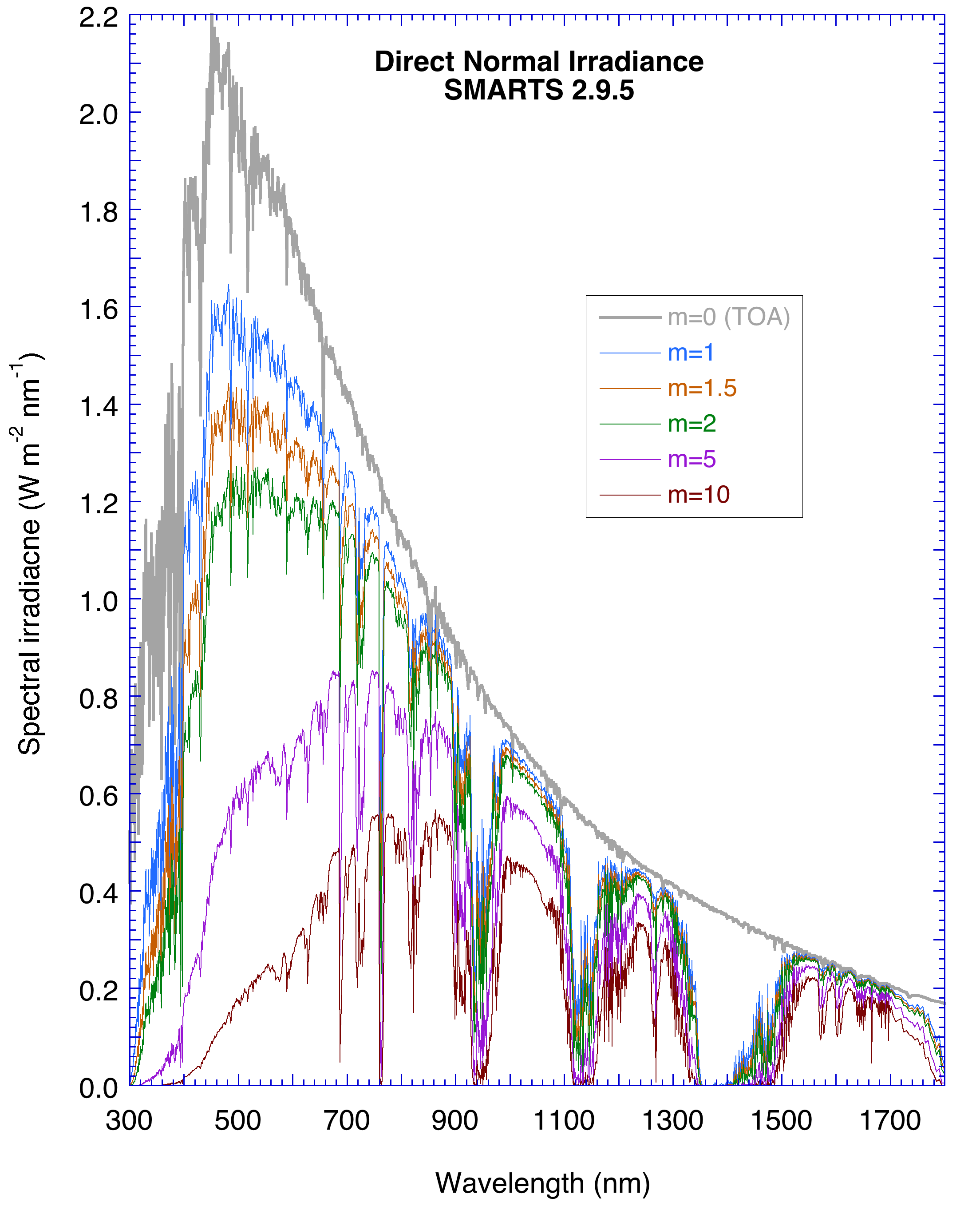
Direct normal irradiance spectra calculated with SMARTS 2.9.5 for increasing air mass (0 to 10), using the same atmospheric conditions as the ASTM G173 standard. Air mass 0 corresponds to the extraterrestrial spectrum, marked as Top of Atmosphere (TOA).

== History ==
The first versions of SMARTS were developed by Dr. Gueymard while he was at the Florida Solar Energy Center. The model employed a structure similar to the earlier SPCTRAL2 model, still offered by the National Renewable Energy Laboratory (NREL), but with finer spectral resolution, as well as updated extraterrestrial spectrum and transmittance functions. The latter consisted mostly of parameterizations of results obtained with MODTRAN.

The latest versions (2.9.2 and 2.9.5) of SMARTS are hosted by NREL. The program can be freely downloaded but is subject to a License Agreement, which limits its use to civilian research and education. For new users, an optional graphical interface (for Windows OS only) is available to ease the preparation of the input file. Program packages are available for the Windows, Macintosh, and Linux platforms.

== Applications ==
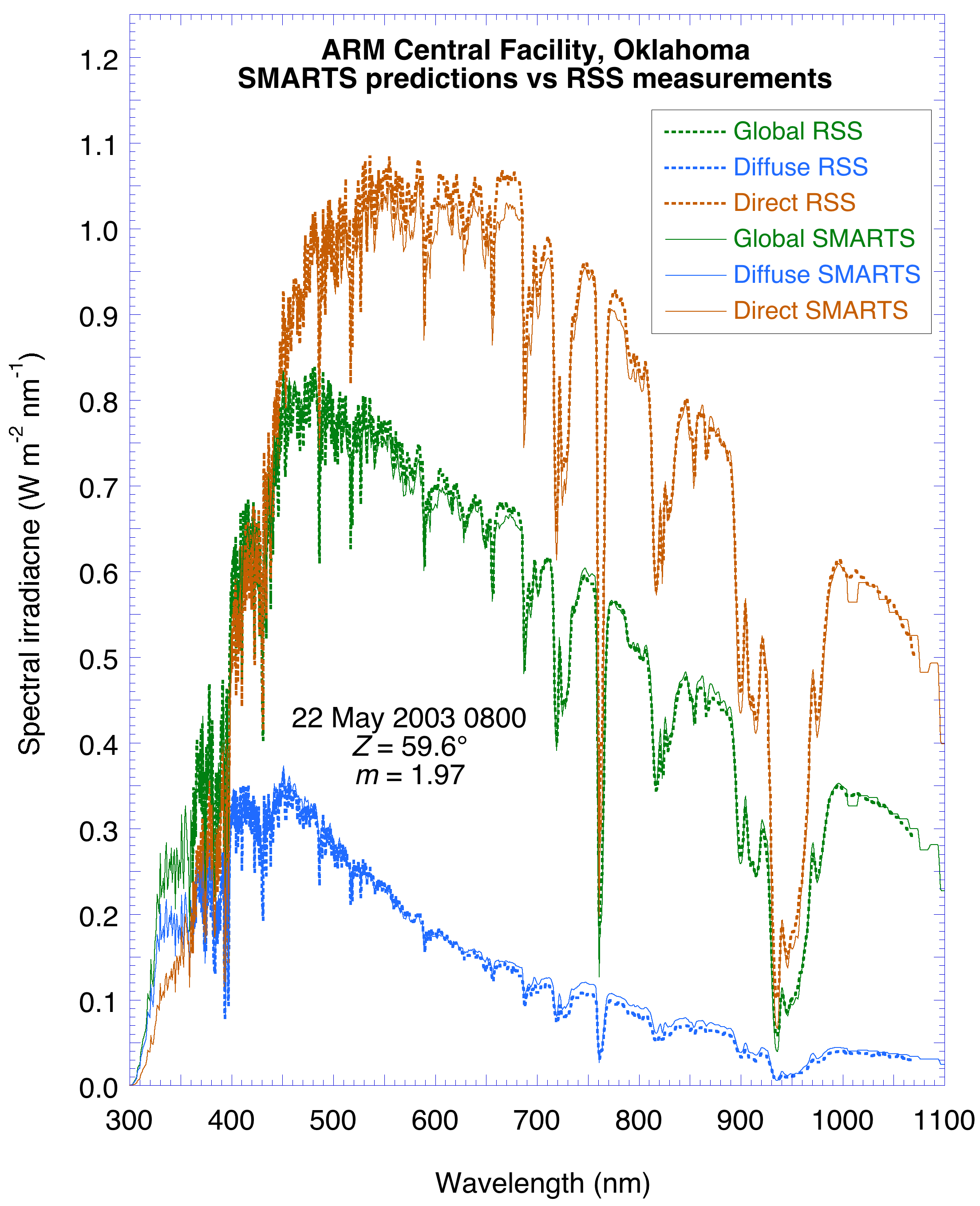
Comparison of direct normal, diffuse horizontal, and global horizontal spectra predicted by SMARTS v2.9.2 and measured with a Rotating Shadowband Spectroradiometer (RSS) at the ARM CART site in Oklahoma; the air mass was about 2 for that specific test.

SMARTS version 2.9.2 was selected to prepare various reference terrestrial spectra, which have been standardized by ASTM under the designations G173, G177 and G197, and by IEC under 60904-3. The latter standard represents the spectral distribution of global irradiance incident on a 37° tilted surface facing the sun at an air mass of 1.5. The integrated irradiance amounts to 1000 W/m^{2}. This standard spectrum is mandated by IEC to evaluate the rating of photovoltaic (PV) solar cells in the absence of optical concentration. PV cells requiring concentration referred to as CPV cells are normally evaluated against the direct spectrum at air mass 1.5 described in ASTM G173. This spectrum integrates to 900 W/m^{2}. The reasons behind the selection of the atmospheric and environmental conditions that eventually led to the development of ASTM G173 are described in a scientific paper. SMARTS version 2.9.2 is considered an adjunct standard to G173 by ASTM. Further details on the use of SMARTS for PV or CPV applications are available in other publications. In particular, the model is frequently used to evaluate real-world efficiencies of PV or CPV modules and evaluate mismatch factors.

The reference spectra in ASTM G197 have been developed to evaluate the optical characteristics of fenestration devices when mounted vertically (windows) or on structures inclined at 20° from the horizontal (skylights on roofs).

The reference spectrum in ASTM G177 is limited to the global irradiance in the ultraviolet (280–400 nm), and corresponds to "high-UV" conditions frequently encountered in arid and elevated sites, such as in the southwest USA. This spectrum is to be used as a reference for testing the degradation and durability of materials.

== Features ==
The program uses various inputs that describe the atmospheric conditions for which the irradiance spectra are to be calculated. Ideal conditions, based on various possible model atmospheres and aerosol models, can be selected by the user. Alternatively, realistic conditions can also be specified as inputs, based for example on aerosol and water vapor data provided by a sunphotometer. In turn, these realistic conditions are necessary to compare the modeled spectra to those measured by a spectroradiometer. Reciprocally, since the model is well validated, this comparative method can be used as guidance to detect malfunction or miscalibration of instruments. The original spectral resolution of the model is 0.5 nm in the UV, 1 nm in the visible and near-infrared, and 5 nm above 1700 nm. To facilitate comparisons between the modeled spectra and actual measurements at a different spectral resolution, the SMARTS post-processor may be used to smooth the modeled spectra and adapt them to simulate the optical characteristics of a specific spectroradiometer. Additionally, the model provides the spectrally-integrated (or "broadband") irradiance values, which can then be compared to measurements from a pyrheliometer (for direct radiation) or pyranometer (for diffuse or global radiation) at any instant. Besides the atmospheric conditions, another important input is the solar geometry, which can be defined by the sun position (zenith angle and azimuth), the air mass, or by specifying the date, time, and location.

Optional calculations include the circumsolar irradiance, illuminance components, photosynthetically active radiation (PAR) components, and irradiance calculations in the UV, involving a variety of action spectra (such as that corresponding to the erythema).

The program outputs its results to text files, which can be further imported and processed into spreadsheets. A graphic interface, providing plots of the calculated spectra using National Instruments' LabVIEW software, is also available.

== See also ==
- Air mass (solar energy)
- Atmosphere of Earth
- Concentrated photovoltaics
- Diffuse sky radiation
- Electromagnetic radiation and health
- Illuminance
- Insolation
- Irradiance
- List of atmospheric radiative transfer codes
- MODTRAN
- Rayleigh scattering
- Sunlight
- Sunshine
