= COART =

COART (Coupled Ocean-Atmospheric Radiative Transfer code) - COART is established on the Coupled DIScrete Ordinate Radiative Transfer (Coupled DISORT or CDISORT) code, developed from DISORT. It is designed to simulate radiance (including water-leaving radiance) and irradiance (flux) at any levels in the atmosphere and ocean consistently.

== See also ==
- List of atmospheric radiative transfer codes
- Atmospheric radiative transfer codes
