= List of refractive indices =

Refraction at interface

Most of the materials have a well-characterized refractive index, but these indices often depend strongly upon the frequency of light, causing optical dispersion. Standard refractive index measurements are taken at the "yellow doublet" sodium D line, with a wavelength (λ) of 589 nanometers.

There are also weaker dependencies on temperature, pressure/stress, etc., as well on precise material compositions (presence of dopants, etc.); for many materials and typical conditions, however, these variations are at the percent level or less. Thus, it's especially important to cite the source for an index measurement if precision is required.

In general, an index of refraction is a complex number with both a real and imaginary part, where the latter indicates the strength of absorption loss at a particular wavelength—thus, the imaginary part is sometimes called the extinction coefficient $k$. Such losses become particularly significant, for example, in metals at short (e.g. visible) wavelengths, and must be included in any description of the refractive index.

Refraction, critical angle and total internal reflection of light at the interface between two media.

== List ==
Some representative refractive indices
Name of material	λ (nm)	Refractive index no. n	Reference
Vacuum		1 (by definition)	
Air at STP		1.000273	
Gases at 0 °C and 1 atm
Helium	589.29	1.000036	
Hydrogen	589.29	1.000132	
Air	589.29	1.000293	
Carbon dioxide	589.29	1.00045	
Liquids at 20 °C
Water	589.29	1.333	
10% glucose solution in water	589.29	1.3477	
Acetone		1.36	
Ethanol (ethyl alcohol)	590.29	1.361	
20% glucose solution in water	589.29	1.3635	
Silicone oil (nD^{25})	589.29	1.393–1.403	
60% glucose solution in water	589.29	1.4394	
Kerosene		1.44	
Carbon tetrachloride	589.29	1.461	
Benzene	589.29	1.501	
Carbon disulfide	589.29	1.628	
Arsenic trisulfide and sulfur in methylene iodide		1.9	
Solids at room temperature
Fused silica (a pure form of glass, also called fused quartz)	589.29	1.458	
Sodium chloride	589.29	1.544	
Amber	589.29	1.55	
Tantalum pentoxide	589.29	2.15	
Strontium titanate	589.29	2.41	
Diamond	589.29	2.417	
Titanium dioxide (rutile phase)	589.29	2.614	
Silicon carbide (moissanite; 6H form)	589.29	2.65	
Other materials
Liquid helium		1.025	
Perfluorohexane (Fluorinert FC-72)		1.251	
Water ice		1.31	
TFE/PDD (Teflon AF)		1.315	
Cryolite		1.338	
Cytop		1.34	
Polytetrafluoroethylene (Teflon)		1.35–1.38	
Sugar solution, 25%		1.3723	
Cornea (human)		1.373/1.380/1.401	
Lens (human)		1.386–1.406	
Liver (human)	964	1.369	
Intestinal mucosa (human)	964	1.329–1.338	
Ethylene tetrafluoroethylene (ETFE)		1.403	
Sylgard 184 (polydimethylsiloxane)		1.4118	
Sugar solution, 50%		1.4200	
Polylactic acid		1.46	
Pyrex (a borosilicate glass)		1.470	
Vegetable oil		1.47	
Glycerol		1.4729	
Sugar solution, 75%		1.4774	
Poly(methyl methacrylate) (PMMA)		1.4893–1.4899	
Halite (rock salt)		1.516	
Plate glass (window glass)		1.52	
Crown glass (pure)		1.50–1.54	
PETg		1.57	
Polyethylene terephthalate (PET)		1.5750	
Polycarbonate	150	1.60	
Crown glass (impure)		1.485–1.755	
Flint glass (pure)		1.60–1.62	
Bromine		1.661	
Flint glass (impure)		1.523–1.925	
Sapphire		1.762–1.778	
Boron nitride		2–2.14	
Cubic zirconia		2.15–2.18	
Potassium niobate (KNbO_{3})		2.28	
Zinc oxide	390	2.4	
Cinnabar (mercury sulfide)		3.02	Birefringent: n_{ω} = 2.905 n_{ε} = 3.256
Silicon	1200 - 8500	3.42–3.48	
Gallium(III) phosphide		3.5	
Gallium(III) arsenide		3.927	
Germanium	3000 - 16000	4.05–4.1	

== See also ==
- Sellmeier equation
- Corrective lens#Ophthalmic material property tables
- Optical properties of water and ice
