= RTTOV (radiative transfer code) =

RTTOV - the fast radiative transfer model for calculations of radiances for satellite infrared or microwave nadir scanning radiometers (see push broom scanner).

Given an atmospheric profile of temperature, variable gas concentrations, cloud and surface properties RTTOV calculates radiances and brightness temperatures. The only mandatory input is water vapour. Optionally ozone, carbon dioxide, nitrous oxide, methane and carbon monoxide can be variable with all other constituents assumed to be constant. The range of temperatures and water vapour concentrations over which the optical depth computations are valid depends on the training datasets which were used. The spectral range of the RTTOV9.1 model is 3-20 micrometres (500 – 3000 cm-1) in the infrared.

RTTOV contains forward, tangent linear, adjoint and K (full Jacobian matrices) versions of the model; the latter three modules for variational assimilation or retrieval applications.

One of several applications of RTTOV are retrievals of brightness temperature and sea surface temperature from Advanced Very High Resolution Radiometer sensor.

== FASTEM ==
Surface emissivity model which parameterizes surface emissivity. FASTEM2 computes the surface emissivity averaged over all facets representing the surface of the ocean and an effective path correction factor for the down-welling brightness temperature. FASTEM2 is applicable for frequencies between 10 and 220 GHz, for earth incidence angles less than 60 degrees.

== See also ==
- List of atmospheric radiative transfer codes
- Community Radiative Transfer Model
