= 4A/OP =

4A/OP or, Automatized Atmospheric Absorption Atlas, is an operational fast and accurate radiative transfer model for the infrared.

4A/OP is a user-friendly software for various scientific applications (surface, balloon or space-based observations), co-developed by LMD (Laboratoire de Meteorologie Dynamique) and NOVELTIS with the support of CNES (the French Space Agency).

NOVELTIS is in charge of the industrialization and the distribution of the LMD 4A radiative transfer model. 4A allows fast and accurate computation of transmittance and radiance, owing to the use of a comprehensive database (atlases) of monochromatic optical thicknesses for up to 43 atmospheric molecular species. Precomputed once and for all, the atlases are created by using the line-by-line and layer-by-layer model, STRANSAC, with up to date physics. Owing to the computation of Jacobians (partial derivatives of the radiance with respect to atmospheric variables), the 4A model can be easily coupled with an inversion algorithm for the retrieval of atmospheric temperature or composition from infrared radiance measurements.

It uses spectroscopy from the regularly updated GEISA spectral line data catalog. Other spectroscopy databanks can be used.

The 4A/OP software is a version of the 4A code for distribution to registered users. This version is regularly updated and improved and contains a graphical user interface and a reference documentation.

This software is used by several research groups and can be integrated in operational processing chains. In particular, 4A/OP is the reference radiative transfer model for the CNES/EUMETSAT Infrared Atmospheric Sounder Interferometer (IASI) level 1 Cal/Val and level 1 operational processing.

== See also ==
- List of atmospheric radiative transfer codes
- Atmospheric radiative transfer codes
- Absorption spectrum
- GEISA
