= Optical properties of water and ice =

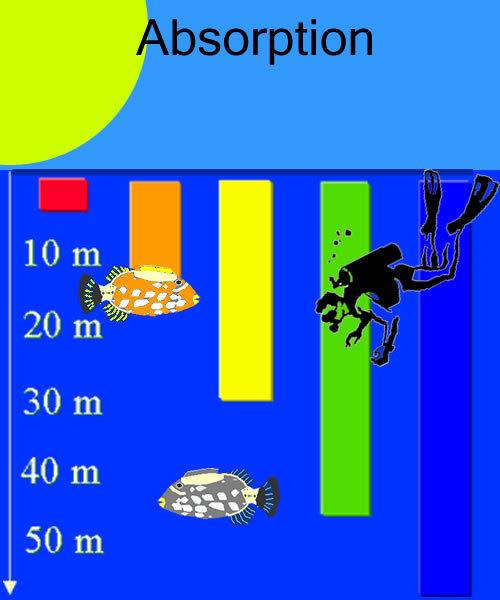
Absorption of light in water

The refractive index of water at 20 °C for visible light is 1.33. The refractive index of normal ice is 1.31 (from List of refractive indices). In general, an index of refraction is a complex number with real and imaginary parts, where the latter indicates the strength of absorption loss at a particular wavelength. In the visible part of the electromagnetic spectrum, the imaginary part of the refractive index is very small. However, water and ice absorb in infrared and close the infrared atmospheric window, thereby contributing to the greenhouse effect.

The absorption spectrum of pure water is used in numerous applications, including light scattering and absorption by ice crystals and cloud water droplets, theories of the rainbow, determination of the single-scattering albedo, ocean color, and many others.

== Quantitative description of the refraction index ==
Over the wavelengths from 0.2 to 1.2 μm, and over temperatures from −12 to 500 °C (261 to 773 K), the real part of the index of refraction of water can be calculated from the following empirical expression:
$$\frac{n^2 - 1}{n^2 + 2} \frac{1}{\bar\rho} =
a_0 +
a_1 \bar\rho +
a_2 \bar T +
a_3 \bar\lambda^2 \bar T +
\frac{a_4}{\bar\lambda^2} +
\frac{a_5}{\bar\lambda^2 - \bar\lambda_\text{UV}^2} +
\frac{a_6}{\bar\lambda^2 - \bar\lambda_\text{IR}^2} +
a_7 \bar\rho^2,$$
where $\bar T = T/T^*,$ $\bar\rho = \rho/\rho^*,$ $\bar\lambda = \lambda/\lambda^*,$ and the constants are

$a_0$ = 0.244257733,
$a_1$ = 0.00974634476,
$a_2$ = −0.00373234996,
$a_3$ = 0.000268678472,
$a_4$ = 0.0015892057,
$a_5$ = 0.00245934259,
$a_6$ = 0.90070492,
$a_7$ = −0.0166626219,

$T^*$ = 273.15 K,
$\rho^*$ = 1000 kg/m^{3},
$\lambda^*$ = 0.589 μm,
$\bar\lambda_\text{IR}$ = 5.432937 μm,
$\bar\lambda_\text{UV}$ = 0.229202 μm.

In the above expression, T is the absolute temperature of water, $\lambda$ is the wavelength of light, $\rho$ is the density of the water, and n is the real part of the index of refraction of water.

== Volumic mass of water ==
In the above formula, the density of water also varies with temperature and is described by
$$\rho(t) = a_5 \left(1 - \frac{(t + a_1)^2 (t + a_2)}{a_3(t + a_4)}\right)$$
with t in °C and

$a_1$ = −3.983035 °C,
$a_2$ = 301.797 °C,
$a_3$ = 522528.9 °C^{2},
$a_4$ = 69.34881 °C,
$a_5$ = 999.974950 kg/m^{3}.

== Refractive index (real and imaginary parts) for liquid water ==
Refractive index of liquid water
Wavelength (μm)	Wavenumber (cm^{−1})	Frequency (THz)	n	k	α' (cm^{−1})
0.200	5.00×10^{4}	1.50×10^{3}	1.396	1.1×10^{−7}	0.069
0.225	4.44×10^{4}	1.33×10^{3}	1.373	4.9×10^{−8}	0.027
0.250	4.00×10^{4}	1.20×10^{3}	1.362	3.35×10^{−8}	0.0168
0.275	3.64×10^{4}	1.09×10^{3}	1.354	2.35×10^{−8}	0.0107
0.300	3.33×10^{4}	999	1.349	1.6×10^{−8}	6.7×10^{−3}
0.325	3.08×10^{4}	922	1.346	1.08×10^{−8}	4.18×10^{−3}
0.350	2.86×10^{4}	857	1.343	6.5×10^{−9}	2.3×10^{−3}
0.375	2.67×10^{4}	799	1.341	3.5×10^{−9}	1.2×10^{−3}
0.400	2.50×10^{4}	749	1.339	1.86×10^{−9}	5.84×10^{−4}
0.425	2.35×10^{4}	705	1.338	1.3×10^{−9}	3.8×10^{−4}
0.450	2.22×10^{4}	666	1.337	1.02×10^{−9}	2.85×10^{−4}
0.475	2.11×10^{4}	631	1.336	9.35×10^{−10}	2.47×10^{−4}
0.500	2.00×10^{4}	600	1.335	1.00×10^{−9}	2.51×10^{−4}
0.525	1.90×10^{4}	571	1.334	1.32×10^{−9}	3.16×10^{−4}
0.550	1.82×10^{4}	545	1.333	1.96×10^{−9}	4.48×10^{−4}
0.575	1.74×10^{4}	521	1.333	3.60×10^{−9}	7.87×10^{−4}
0.600	1.67×10^{4}	500	1.332	1.09×10^{−8}	2.28×10^{−3}
0.625	1.60×10^{4}	480	1.332	1.39×10^{−8}	2.79×10^{−3}
0.650	1.54×10^{4}	461	1.331	1.64×10^{−8}	3.17×10^{−3}
0.675	1.48×10^{4}	444	1.331	2.23×10^{−8}	4.15×10^{−3}
0.700	1.43×10^{4}	428	1.331	3.35×10^{−8}	6.01×10^{−3}
0.725	1.38×10^{4}	414	1.330	9.15×10^{−8}	0.0159
0.750	1.33×10^{4}	400	1.330	1.56×10^{−7}	0.0261
0.775	1.29×10^{4}	387	1.330	1.48×10^{−7}	0.0240
0.800	1.25×10^{4}	375	1.329	1.25×10^{−7}	0.0196
0.825	1.21×10^{4}	363	1.329	1.82×10^{−7}	0.0282
0.850	1.18×10^{4}	353	1.329	2.93×10^{−7}	0.0433
0.875	1.14×10^{4}	343	1.328	3.91×10^{−7}	0.0562
0.900	1.11×10^{4}	333	1.328	4.86×10^{−7}	0.0679
0.925	1.08×10^{4}	324	1.328	1.06×10^{−6}	0.144
0.950	1.05×10^{4}	316	1.327	2.93×10^{−6}	0.388
0.975	1.03×10^{4}	307	1.327	3.48×10^{−6}	0.449
1.0	1.0×10^{4}	300	1.327	2.89×10^{−6}	0.36
1.2	8300	250	1.324	9.89×10^{−6}	1.0
1.4	7100	210	1.321	1.38×10^{−4}	12
1.6	6200	190	1.317	8.55×10^{−5}	6.7
1.8	5600	170	1.312	1.15×10^{−4}	8.0
2.0	5000	150	1.306	1.1×10^{−3}	69
2.2	4500	136	1.296	2.89×10^{−4}	17
2.4	4200	125	1.279	9.56×10^{−4}	50
2.6	3800	115	1.242	3.17×10^{−3}	150
2.65	3770	113	1.219	6.7×10^{−5}	318
2.70	3700	111	1.188	0.019	880
2.75	3640	109	1.157	0.059	2700
2.80	3570	107	1.142	0.115	5160
2.85	3510	105	1.149	0.185	8160
2.90	3450	103	1.201	0.268	11600
2.95	3390	102	1.292	0.298	12700
3.00	3330	100.	1.371	0.272	11400
3.05	3280	98.3	1.426	0.240	9990
3.10	3230	96.7	1.467	0.192	7780
3.15	3170	95.2	1.483	0.135	5390
3.20	3120	93.7	1.478	0.0924	3630
3.25	3080	92.2	1.467	0.0610	2360
3.30	3030	90.8	1.450	0.0368	1400
3.35	2990	89.5	1.432	0.0261	979
3.40	2940	88.2	1.420	0.0195	721
3.45	2900	86.9	1.410	0.0132	481
3.50	2860	85.7	1.400	0.0094	340
3.6	2780	83	1.385	0.00515	180
3.7	2700	81	1.374	0.00360	120
3.8	2630	79	1.364	0.00340	110
3.9	2560	77	1.357	0.00380	120
4.0	2500	75	1.351	0.00460	140
4.1	2440	73	1.346	0.00562	170
4.2	2380	71	1.342	0.00688	210
4.3	2330	70	1.338	0.00845	250
4.4	2270	69	1.334	0.0103	290
4.5	2220	67	1.332	0.0134	370
4.6	2170	65	1.330	0.0147	400
4.7	2130	64	1.330	0.0157	420
4.8	2080	62	1.330	0.0150	390
4.9	2040	61	1.328	0.0137	350
5.0	2000	60	1.325	0.0124	310
5.1	1960	59	1.322	0.0111	270
5.2	1920	58	1.317	0.0101	240
5.3	1890	57	1.312	0.0098	230
5.4	1850	56	1.305	0.0103	240
5.5	1820	55	1.298	0.0116	380
5.6	1790	54	1.289	0.0142	320
5.7	1750	53	1.277	0.0203	450
5.8	1720	52	1.262	0.0330	710
5.9	1690	51	1.248	0.0622	1300
6.0	1670	50	1.265	0.107	2200
6.1	1640	49	1.319	0.131	2700
6.2	1610	48.4	1.363	0.0880	1800
6.3	1590	47.6	1.357	0.0570	1100
6.4	1560	46.8	1.347	0.0449	880
6.5	1540	46.1	1.339	0.0392	760
6.6	1520	45.4	1.334	0.0356	680
6.7	1490	44.7	1.329	0.0337	630
6.8	1470	44.1	1.324	0.0327	600
6.9	1450	43.4	1.321	0.0322	590
7.0	1430	42.8	1.317	0.0320	570

The total refractive index of water is given as m = n + ik. The absorption coefficient α' is used in the Beer–Lambert law with the prime here signifying base e convention. Values are for water at 25 °C and were obtained through various sources in the cited literature review.

== See also ==
- Absorption (electromagnetic radiation)
- Atmospheric radiative transfer codes
- Color of water
- Electromagnetic absorption by water
- Ocean color
- Ocean optics
- List of refractive indices
