= Spectral Sciences Incorporated =

- Founded: 1981; 45 years ago
- Headquarters: Burlington, Massachusetts, United States
- Website: spectral.com

Spectral Sciences Incorporated (SSI), founded in 1981, is a research and development company located in Burlington, Massachusetts, United States.

Its primary focus is the development of concepts and prototype scientific software and instrumentation.

Areas of expertise include electro-optic remote sensing, atmospheric radiation transport, the science of combustion, computational physics, chemistry and molecular dynamics, energy management, 3-D and spectral scene modeling, spectroscopy, UV through IR optical signature analysis, tomography methods and analysis and electro-optical instrumentation development in support of phenomenological studies and new measurement concepts.

== Products ==
- FLAASH and QUAC, atmospheric correction codes which calculate spectrally resolved ground reflectance from hyperspectral imaging and multispectral imaging. Both codes are available as the Atmospheric Correction Module plug-in for ENVI.

- MODTRAN radiative transfer code.
