= GEISA =

GEISA - GEISA (Gestion et Etude des Informations Spectroscopiques Atmosphériques: Management and Study of Spectroscopic Information) is a computer-accessible spectroscopic database, designed to facilitate accurate forward radiative transfer calculations using a line-by-line and layer-by-layer approach. It was started in 1974, at Laboratoire de Météorologie Dynamique (LMD) in France. GEISA is maintained by the ARA group at LMD (Ecole Polytechnique) for its scientific part and by the ETHER group (CNRS Centre National de la Recherche Scientifique-France) at IPSL (Institut Pierre Simon Laplace) for its technical part. Currently, GEISA is involved in activities related to the assessment of the capabilities of IASI (Infrared Atmospheric Sounding Interferometer on board of the METOP European satellite) through the GEISA/IASI database derived from GEISA.

== See also ==
- List of atmospheric radiative transfer codes
- Atmospheric radiative transfer codes
- Google scholar papers on GEISA
- Absorption spectrum
- 4A/OP
