= FUTBOLIN =

FUTBOLIN (FUll Transfer By Optimized LINe-by-line methods) is a radiative transfer model for the calculation of line-by-line atmospheric emission/transmission spectra in planetary atmospheres. It has been developed by Javier Martín-Torres. It allows generating high-resolution synthetic spectra in the 0.3-1000 micrometre spectral range.

The code can handle spherical or plane-parallel atmospheres. It reads spectral lines in HITRAN or GEISA format and can handle CO_{2} line mixing and continuum absorption from H_{2}O, O_{2}, N_{2} and CO_{2}. It also takes into account the Non Local Thermodynamic Equilibrium (NLTE) effects on the rotational, electronic and vibrational populations of the atmospheric species and allows to specify any combinations of clouds, coverage and spectral albedo. It has been used to model the Earth's atmosphere, and the atmospheres of Mars, Venus, and Titan.

The code can calculate reflection, transmission, absorption, infrared cooling rate, and flux spectra.

== See also ==
- Radiative transfer
