= Atmospheric radiative transfer codes =

Calculation of radiative transfer of atmospheric electromagnetic radiation

An atmospheric radiative transfer model, code, or simulator calculates radiative transfer of electromagnetic radiation through a planetary atmosphere.

== Methods ==
At the core of a radiative transfer model lies the radiative transfer equation that is numerically solved using a solver such as a discrete ordinate method or a Monte Carlo method. The radiative transfer equation is a monochromatic equation to calculate radiance in a single layer of the Earth's atmosphere. To calculate the radiance for a spectral region with a finite width (e.g., to estimate the Earth's energy budget or simulate an instrument response), one has to integrate this over a band of frequencies (or wavelengths). The most exact way to do this is to loop through the frequencies of interest, and for each frequency, calculate the radiance at this frequency. For this, one needs to calculate the contribution of each spectral line for all molecules in the atmospheric layer; this is called a line-by-line calculation. For an instrument response, this is then convolved with the spectral response of the instrument.

A faster but more approximate method is a band transmission. Here, the transmission in a region in a band is characterised by a set of pre-calculated coefficients (depending on temperature and other parameters). In addition, models may consider scattering from molecules or particles, as well as polarisation; however, not all models do so.

== Applications ==
Radiative transfer codes are used in broad range of applications. They are commonly used as forward models for the retrieval of geophysical parameters (such as temperature or humidity). Radiative transfer models are also used to optimize solar photovoltaic systems for renewable energy generation. Another common field of application is in a weather or climate model, where the radiative forcing is calculated for greenhouse gases, aerosols, or clouds. In such applications, radiative transfer codes are often called radiation parameterization. In these applications, the radiative transfer codes are used in forward sense, i.e. on the basis of known properties of the atmosphere, one calculates heating rates, radiative fluxes, and radiances.

There are efforts for intercomparison of radiation codes. One such project was ICRCCM (Intercomparison of Radiation Codes in Climate Models) effort that spanned the late 1980s – early 2000s. The more current (2011) project, Continual Intercomparison of Radiation Codes, emphasises also using observations to define intercomparison cases.

== Table of models ==
Name	Website	References	UV	Visible	Near IR	Thermal IR	mm/sub-mm	Microwave	line-by-line/band	Scattering	Polarised	Geometry	License	Notes
4A/OP		Scott and Chédin (1981)	No	No	Yes	Yes	No	No	band or line-by-line	Yes	Yes		freeware	
6S/6SV1		Kotchenova et al. (1997)	No	Yes	Yes	No	No	No	band	?	Yes			non-Lambertian surface
ARTS		Eriksson et al. (2011) Buehler et al. (2018)	No	No	No	Yes	Yes	Yes	line-by-line	Yes	Yes	spherical 1D, 2D, 3D	GPL	
BTRAM		Chapman et al. (2009)	No	Yes	Yes	Yes	Yes	Yes	line-by-line	No	No	1D, plane-parallel	proprietary commercial	
COART		Jin et al. (2006)	Yes	Yes	Yes	Yes	No	No		Yes	No	plane-parallel	free	
CMFGEN		Hillier (2020)	Yes	Yes	Yes	Yes	Yes	Yes	line-by-line	Yes	Yes	1D		
CRM			No	Yes	Yes	Yes	No	No	band	Yes	No		freely available	Part of NCAR Community Climate Model
CRTM		Johnson et al. (2023)	v3.0	Yes	Yes	Yes	Yes	passive, active	band	Yes	v3.0, UV/VIS	1D, Plane-Parallel	Public Domain	Fresnel ocean surfaces, Lambertian non-ocean surface
DART radiative transfer model		Gastellu-Etchegorry et al. (1996)	No	Yes	Yes	Yes	No	No	band	Yes	?	spherical 1D, 2D, 3D	free for research with license	non-Lambertian surface, landscape creation and import
DISORT		Stamnes et al. (1988) Lin et al. (2015)	Yes	Yes	Yes	Yes	Yes	radar		Yes	No	plane-parallel or pseudo-spherical (v4.0)	free with restrictions	discrete ordinate, used by others
Eradiate			No	Yes	Yes	No	No	No	band or line-by-line	Yes	No	plane-parallel, spherical	LGPL	3D surface simulation
FARMS		Xie et al. (2016)	λ>0.2 µm	Yes	Yes	No	No	No	band	Yes	No	plane-parallel	free	Rapidly simulating downwelling solar radiation at land surface for solar energy and climate research
Fu-Liou		Fu and Liou (1993)	No	Yes	Yes	?	No	No		Yes	?	plane-parallel	usage online, source code available	web interface online:
FUTBOLIN		Martin-Torres (2005)	λ>0.3 µm	Yes	Yes	Yes	λ<1000 µm	No	line-by-line	Yes	?	spherical or plane-parallel		handles line-mixing, continuum absorption and NLTE
GENLN2		Edwards (1992)	?	?	?	Yes	?	?	line-by-line	?	?			
KARINE		Eymet (2005)	No	No	Yes		No	No		?	?	plane-parallel	GPL	
KCARTA			?	?	Yes	Yes	?	?	line-by-line	Yes	?	plane-parallel	freely available	AIRS reference model
KOPRA			No	No	No	Yes	No	No		?	?			
LBLRTM		Clough et al. (2005)	Yes	Yes	Yes	Yes	Yes	Yes	line-by-line	?	?			
LEEDR		Fiorino et al. (2014)	λ>0.2 µm	Yes	Yes	Yes	Yes	Yes	band or line-by-line	Yes	?	spherical	US government software	extended solar & lunar sources; single & multiple scattering
LinePak		Gordley et al. (1994)	Yes	Yes	Yes	Yes	Yes	Yes	line-by-line	No	No	spherical (Earth and Mars), plane-parallel	freely available with restrictions	web interface, SpectralCalc
libRadtran		Mayer and Kylling (2005)	Yes	Yes	Yes	Yes	No	No	band or line-by-line	Yes	Yes	plane-parallel or pseudo-spherical	GPL	
MATISSE		Caillault et al. (2007)	No	Yes	Yes	Yes	No	No	band	Yes	?		proprietary freeware	
MCARaTS													GPL	3-D Monte Carlo
MODTRAN		Berk et al. (1998)	ṽ<50,000 cm^{−1} (eq. to λ>0.2 µm)	Yes	Yes	Yes	Yes	Yes	band or line-by-line	Yes	?		proprietary commercial	solar and lunar source, uses DISORT
MOSART		Cornette (2006)	λ>0.2 µm	Yes	Yes	Yes	Yes	Yes	band	Yes	No		freely available	
MSCART		Wang et al. (2017) Wang et al. (2019)	Yes	Yes	Yes	No	No	No		Yes	Yes	1D, 2D, 3D	available on request	
PICASO	link	Batalha et al. (2019) Mukherjee et al. (2022)	λ>0.3 μm	Yes	Yes	Yes	No	No	band or correlated-k	Yes	No	plane-parallel, 1D, 3D	GPL Github	exoplanet, brown dwarf, climate modeling, phase-dependence
Planetary Spectrum Generator (PUMAS)		Villanueva (2018)	Yes	Yes	Yes	Yes	Yes	Yes	Line-by-line and correlated-k	Yes	Yes	plane-parallel and pseudo-spherical	Free/online tool	Solar system objects (planets, comets), exoplanets
RADIS		Pannier (2018)	No	No	Yes		No	No		No	No	1D	GPL	
RFM		Dudhia (2017)	yes without scattering	yes without scattering	Yes	Yes	Yes	Yes	line-by-line	No	No		freely available on request	MIPAS reference model based on GENLN2
RRTM/RRTMG		Mlawer, et al. (1997)	ṽ<50,000 cm^{−1} (eq. to λ>0.2 µm)	Yes	Yes	Yes	Yes	ṽ>10 cm^{−1}		?	?		free of charge	uses DISORT
RTMOM			λ>0.25 µm	Yes	Yes	λ<15 µm	No	No	line-by-line	Yes	?	plane-parallel	freeware	
RTTOV		Saunders et al. (1999)	λ>0.4 µm	Yes	Yes	Yes	Yes	Yes	band	Yes	?		available on request	
SASKTRAN		Bourassa et al. (2008) Zawada et al. (2015)	Yes	Yes	Yes	No	No	No	line-by-line	Yes	Yes	spherical 1D, 2D, 3D, plane-parallel	available on request	discrete and Monte Carlo options
SBDART		Ricchiazzi et al. (1998)	Yes	Yes	Yes	?	No	No		Yes	?	plane-parallel		uses DISORT
SCIATRAN		Rozanov et al. (2005), Rozanov et al. (2014)[42]	Yes	Yes	Yes	No	No	No	band or line-by-line	Yes	Yes	plane-parallel or pseudo-spherical or spherical		
SHARM		Lyapustin (2002)	No	Yes	Yes	No	No	No		Yes	?			
SHDOM		Evans (2006)	?	?	Yes	Yes	?	?		Yes	?			
σ-IASI		Amato et al. (2002) Masiello et al. (2024)	No	No	Yes	Yes	Yes	No	band, based on LBLRTM v12.4	Yes	No	plane-parallel	Source code available online. Free for non commercial purposes.	Analytical Jacobians. Complex treatment of aerosols/clouds with Tang scheme.
SMART-G		Ramon et al. (2019)	Yes	Yes	Yes	No	No	No	band or line-by-line	Yes	Yes	plane-parallel or spherical	free for non-commercial purposes	Monte-Carlo code parallelized by GPU (CUDA). Atmosphere or/and ocean options
Streamer, Fluxnet		Key and Schweiger (1998)	No	No	λ>0.6 mm	λ<15 mm	No	No	band	Yes	?	plane-parallel		Fluxnet is fast version of STREAMER using neural nets
XRTM			Yes	Yes	Yes	Yes	Yes	Yes		Yes	Yes	plane-parallel and pseudo-spherical	GPL	
VLIDORT/LIDORT		Spurr and Christi (2019)	Yes	Yes	Yes	Yes	?	?	line-by-line	Yes	Yes VLIDORT only	plane-parallel		Used in SMART and VSTAR radiative transfer
Name	Website	References	UV	VIS	Near IR	Thermal IR	Microwave	mm/sub-mm	line-by-line/band	Scattering	Polarised	Geometry	License	Notes

=== Molecular absorption databases ===
For a line-by-line calculation, one needs characteristics of the spectral lines, such as the line centre, the intensity, the lower-state energy, the line width and the shape.

Name	Author	Description
HITRAN	Rothman et al. (1987, 1992, 1998, 2003, 2005, 2009, 2013, 2017)	HITRAN is a compilation of molecular spectroscopic parameters that a variety of computer codes use to predict and simulate the transmission and emission of light in the atmosphere. The original version was created at the Air Force Cambridge Research Laboratories (1960's). The database is maintained and developed at the Harvard-Smithsonian Center for Astrophysics in Cambridge MA, USA.
GEISA	Jacquinet-Husson et al. (1999, 2005, 2008)	GEISA (Gestion et Etude des Informations Spectroscopiques Atmosphériques: Management and Study of Spectroscopic Information) is a computer-accessible spectroscopic database, designed to facilitate accurate forward radiative transfer calculations using a line-by-line and layer-by-layer approach. It was started in 1974 at Laboratoire de Météorologie Dynamique (LMD/IPSL) in France. GEISA is maintained by the ARA group at LMD (Ecole Polytechnique) for its scientific part and by the ETHER group (CNRS Centre National de la Recherche Scientifique-France) at IPSL (Institut Pierre Simon Laplace) for its technical part. Currently, GEISA is involved in activities related to the assessment of the capabilities of IASI (Infrared Atmospheric Sounding Interferometer on board of the METOP European satellite) through the GEISA/IASI database derived from GEISA.

== See also ==
- Discrete dipole approximation codes
- Codes for electromagnetic scattering by cylinders
- Codes for electromagnetic scattering by spheres
- Optical properties of water and ice
