= Shortwave radiation (optics) =

Type of radiant energy

Spectral intensity of sunlight (average at top of atmosphere) and thermal radiation emitted by Earth's surface.

Shortwave radiation (SW) is thermal radiation in the optical spectrum, including visible (VIS), near-ultraviolet (UV), and near-infrared (NIR) spectra.

There is no standard cut-off for the near-infrared range; therefore, the shortwave radiation range is also variously defined. It may be broadly defined to include all radiation with a wavelength of 0.1μm and 5.0μm or narrowly defined so as to include only radiation between 0.2μm and 3.0μm.

There is little radiation flux (in terms of W/m^{2}) to the Earth's surface below 0.2μm or above 3.0μm, although photon flux remains significant as far as 6.0μm, compared to shorter wavelength fluxes. UV-C radiation spans from 0.1μm to .28μm, UV-B from 0.28μm to 0.315μm, UV-A from 0.315μm to 0.4μm, the visible spectrum from 0.4μm to 0.7μm, and NIR arguably from 0.7μm to 5.0μm, beyond which the infrared is thermal.

Shortwave radiation is distinguished from longwave radiation. Downward shortwave radiation is related to solar irradiance and is sensitive to solar zenith angle and cloud cover.

== See also ==
- Outgoing longwave radiation
