= Community Radiative Transfer Model =

The Community Radiative Transfer Model (CRTM) is a fast radiative transfer model for calculations of radiances for satellite infrared or microwave radiometers.

Given an atmospheric profile of temperature, variable gas concentrations, cloud and surface properties CRTM calculates radiances and brightness temperatures. The only mandatory inputs in terms of variable gases are water vapor and ozone. The range of temperatures and water vapour concentrations over which the optical depth computations are valid depends on the training datasets which were used.

CRTM contains forward, tangent linear, adjoint and K (full Jacobian matrices) versions of the model; the latter three modules are used in inversion methods, including variational assimilation and satellite retrievals.

The CRTM model is used primarily in numerical weather prediction codes employed by NOAA and NASA, and is developed and maintained through the Joint Center for Satellite Data Assimilation (JCSDA). Its primary function is to relate changes in satellite-based observations to changes in the model physical state. This capability is essential to the use of satellite observations in data assimilation methodologies. One of several applications of CRTM are retrievals of brightness temperature and sea surface temperature from Advanced Very High Resolution Radiometer sensor, among many other infrared and microwave sensors.

== See also ==
- List of atmospheric radiative transfer codes
- RTTOV (radiative transfer code)
