= 4,4'-Diapophytoene synthase =

Class of enzymes

4,4'-diapophytoene synthase

Identifiers
- EC no.: 2.5.1.96

Databases
- IntEnz: IntEnz view
- BRENDA: BRENDA entry
- ExPASy: NiceZyme view
- KEGG: KEGG entry
- MetaCyc: metabolic pathway
- PRIAM: profile
- PDB structures: RCSB PDB PDBe PDBsum
Search
- PMC: articles
- PubMed: articles
- NCBI: proteins

4,4'-diapophytoene synthase (EC 2.5.1.96, dehydrosqualene synthase, DAP synthase, C30 carotene synthase, CrtM) is an enzyme with systematic name farnesyl-diphosphate:farnesyl-diphosphate farnesyltransferase (4,4'-diapophytoene forming). This enzyme catalyses the following chemical reaction

2 (2E,6E)-farnesyl diphosphate $\rightleftharpoons$ 4,4'-diapophytoene + 2 diphosphate (overall reaction)
(1a) 2 (2E,6E)-farnesyl diphosphate $\rightleftharpoons$ diphosphate + presqualene diphosphate
(1b) presqualene diphosphate $\rightleftharpoons$ 4,4'-diapophytoene + diphosphate

This enzyme requires Mn^{2+}. It is present in Staphylococcus aureus and some other bacteria such as Heliobacillus sp.
