= DART radiative transfer model =

- Original author: Jean-Philippe Gastellu-Etchegorry
- Developer: CESBIO
- Initial release: 1 January 1992
- Written in: C++, Java, and Python
- Operating system: Linux; Windows
- License: Paul Sabatier University
- Website: www.cesbio.ups-tlse.fr/dart/#/

DART (Discrete anisotropic radiative transfer) is a 3D radiative transfer model, designed for scientific research, in particular remote sensing. Developed at CESBIO since 1992, DART model was patented in 2003. It is freeware for scientific activities.

== General Description ==
DART model simulates, simultaneously in several wavelengths of the optical domain (e.g., visible and thermal infrared), the radiative budget and remotely sensed images of any Earth scene (natural / urban with /without relief), for any sun direction, any atmosphere, any view direction and any sensor FTM. It was designed to be precise, easy to use and adapted for operational use. For that, it simulates:

- Terrestrial landscape.
- The atmosphere (optional simulation).
- The space or airborne radiometric sensor (optional simulation).

It simulates any landscape as a 3D matrice of cells that contain turbid material and triangles. Turbid material is used for simulating vegetation (e.g., tree crowns, grass, agricultural crops,...) and the atmosphere. Triangles are used for simulating translucent and opaque surfaces that makes up topography, urban elements and 3D vegetation. DART can use structural and spectral data bases (atmosphere, vegetation, soil,...). It includes a LIDAR simulation mode.

=== General Information On Radiative Transfer ===
The approaches used to simulate radiative transfer differ on 2 levels: mathematical method of resolution and mode of representation of the propagation medium. These two levels are in general dependent. The models of radiative transfer are often divided into 2 categories associated with the 2 principal modes of representation of the landscape: homogeneous or heterogeneous representation. For the models known as homogeneous (Idso and of Wit, 1970; Ross, 1981; Verhoef, 1984; Myneni et al., 1989), the landscape is represented by a constant horizontal distribution of absorbing and scattering elements (sheets, branches, etc...). On the other hand, for the models known as heterogeneous, the landscape is represented by a no uniform space distribution of unspecified elements of the landscape (North, 1996; Govaerts, 1998).

=== Simulation of the "Earth – Atmosphere" scene ===
DART simulates radiative transfer in the "Earth-Atmosphere" system, for any wavelength in the optical domain (shortwaves : visible, thermal infrared,...). Its approach combines the ray tracing and the discrete ordinate methods. It works with natural and urban landscapes (forests with different types of trees, buildings, rivers,...), with topography and atmosphere above and within the landscape. It simulates light propagation from solar irradiance (Top of Atmosphere) and/or thermal emission within the scene.

== Context ==
The study of the functioning of Continental surfaces requires the understanding of the various energetic and physiologic mechanisms that influence these surfaces. For example, the radiation absorbed in the visible spectral domain is the major energy source for vegetation photosynthesis. Moreover, energy and mass fluxes at the "Earth – Atmosphere" interface affect surface functioning, and consequently climatology.

In this context, Earth observation from space (i.e., space remote sensing) is an indispensable tool, due to its unique potential to provide synoptic and continuous surveys of the Earth, at different time and space scales.

The difficulty in studying continental surfaces arises from the complexity of the energetic and physiologic processes involved and also from the different time and space scales concerned. It comes also from the complexity of satellite remote sensing space and from its links to quantities that characterize Earth functioning. These remarks underline the need of models, because only these can couple and gather within a single scheme all concerned processes.

== Major references ==
- Modelling radiative transfer in heterogeneous 3-D vegetation canopies, 1996, Gastellu-Etchegorry JP, Demarez V, Pinel V, Zagolski F, Remote sensing of Environment, 58:131–156.
- Radiative transfer model for simulating high-resolution satellite images, Gascon F., 2001, Gastellu-Etchegorry J.P. et Lefèvre M.J., IEEE, 39(9), 1922–1926.
- The radiation transfer model intercomparison (RAMI) exercise, 2001, Pinty B., Gascon F., Gastellu-Etchegorry et al., Journal of Geophysical Research, Vol. 106, No. D11, June 16, 2001.
- Building a Forward-Mode 3-D Reflectance model for topographic normalization of high-resolution (1-5m) imagery: Validation phase in a forested environment, 2012, Couturier, S., Gastellu-Etchegorry J.P., Martin E., Patiño, P., IEEE, Vol. 51, Number 7, 3910–3921.
- Retrieval of spruce leaf chlorophyll content from airborne image data using continuum removal and radiative transfer, 2013, Malenovský Z., Homolová L., Zurita-Milla R., Lukeš P., Kapland V., Hanuš J., Gastellu-Etchegorry J.P., Schaepman M., Remote sensing of Environment. 131:85–102.
- A new approach of direction discretization and oversampling for 3D anisotropic radiative transfer modeling, 2013, Yin T., Gastellu-Etchegorry J.P., Lauret N., Grau E., Rubio J., Remote Sensing of Environment. 135, pp 213–223
- A canopy radiative transfer scheme with explicit FAPAR for the interactive vegetation model ISBA-A-gs: impact on carbon fluxes, 2013, Carrer D., Roujean J.L., Lafont S., Calvet J.C., Boone A., Decharme B., Delire C., Gastellu-Etchegorry J.P., Journal of Geophysical Research – Biogeosciences, Vol. 118: 1–16
- Investigating the Utility of Wavelet Transforms for Inverting a 3-D Radiative Transfer Model Using Hyperspectral Data to Retrieve Forest LAI, 2013, Banskota A., Wynne R., Thomas V., Serbin S., Kayastha N., Gastellu-Etchegorry J.P., Townsend P., Remote Sensing, 5: 2639–2659
- Directional viewing effects on satellite Land Surface Temperature products over sparse vegetation canopies – A multi-sensor analysis, 2013, Guillevic P.C., Bork-Unkelbach A., Göttsche F.M., Hulley G., Gastellu-Etchegorry J.P., Olesen F.S and Privette J.L., IEEE Geoscience and Remote sensing, 10, 1464–1468.
- Radiative transfer modeling in the "Earth – Atmosphere" system with DART model, 2013, Grau E. and Gastellu-Etchegrry, Remote Sensing of Environment, 139, 149–170
- The 4th radiation transfer model intercomparison (RAMI-IV): Proficiency testing of canopy reflectance models with ISO-13528, 2013, Widlowski J-L, B Pinty, M Lopatka, C Atzberger, D Buzica, M Chelle, M Disney, J-P Gastellu-Etchegorry, M Gerboles, N Gobron, E Grau, H Huang, A Kallel, H Kobayashi, P E Lewis, W Qin, M Schlerf, J Stuckens, D Xie, Journal of Geophysical Research 01/2013 1–22, doi:10.1002/jgrd.50497
- 3D Modeling of Imaging Spectrometer Data: data: 3D forest modeling based on LiDAR and in situ data, 2014, Schneider F.D. Leiterer R., Morsdorf F., Gastellu-Etchegorry J.P., Lauret N., Pfeifer N., Schaepman M.E., Remote Sensing of Environment, 152: 235–250.
- Discrete anisotropic radiative transfer (DART 5) for modeling airborne and satellite spectroradiometer and LIDAR acquisitions of natural and urban landscapes, 2015, Gastellu-Etchegorry J.P., Yin T., Lauret N., 2015, Remote Sensing, 7, 1667–1701: doi: 10.3390/rs70201667.
- A LUT-Based Inversion of DART Model to Estimate Forest LAI from Hyperspectral Data, 2015, Banskota A., Serbin S. P., Wynne R. H., Thomas V.A., Falkowski M.J., Kayastha N., Gastellu-Etchegorry J.P., Townsend P.A., IEEE Geoscience and Remote sensing, JSTARS-2014-00702.R1, in press.
- Simulating images of passive sensors with finite field of view by coupling 3-D radiative transfer model and sensor perspective projection, 2015, Yin T., Lauret N. and Gastellu-Etchegorry J.P., Remote Sensing of Environment, accepted.
