= ARTS (radiative transfer code) =

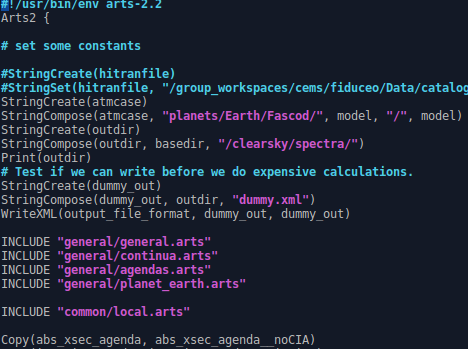
- Screenshot of the top part of a script for ARTS, opened in text editor Vi IMproved 7.4
- Original authors: S.A. Buehler; P. Eriksson; O. Lemke; C. Emde; J. Mendrok
- Release: January 18, 2002; 24 years ago
- Stable release: 2.6.18 / November 6, 2025; 11 months ago
- Written in: C++
- Operating system: Unix-like
- Available in: English language
- Type: Scientific software
- License: GPL
- Website: radiativetransfer.org
- Repository: github.com/atmtools/arts

ARTS (Atmospheric Radiative Transfer Simulator) is a widely used atmospheric radiative transfer simulator for infrared, microwave, and sub-millimeter wavelengths. While the model is developed by a community, core development is done by the University of Hamburg and Chalmers University, with previous participation from Luleå University of Technology and University of Bremen.

Whereas most radiative transfer models are developed for a specific instrument, ARTS is one of few models that aims to be generically applicable. It is designed from basic physical principles and has been used in a wide range of situations. It supports fully polarised radiative transfer calculations in clear-sky or cloudy conditions in 1-D, 2-D, or 3-D geometries, including the calculations of Jacobians. Cloudy simulations support liquid and ice clouds with particles of varying sizes and shapes and supports multiple-scattering simulations. Absorption is calculated line-by-line, with continua or using a lookup table. The user programs ARTS by the means of a simple scripting language. ARTS is a physics-based model and therefore much slower than many radiative transfer models that are used operationally and is currently unable to simulate solar, visible, or shortwave radiation.

ARTS has been used at the University of Maryland to assess radiosonde humidity measurements, by the University of Bern for water vapour retrievals, by the Norwegian University of Science and Technology for Carbon monoxide retrievals above Antarctica, and by the Japanese space agency JAXA to aid the development of retrievals from JEM/SMILES, among others. According to the ARTS website as of November 2016, ARTS has been used in at least 154 peer-reviewed scientific publications.

== See also ==
- Atmospheric radiative transfer codes
