= Rapid radiative transfer model =

Electromagnetic radiation model

The Rapid Radiative Transfer Model (RRTM) is a simulation for the flow of electromagnetic radiation in and out of the Earth. It is a validated, correlated k-distribution band model for the calculation of solar and thermal-infrared atmospheric radiative fluxes and heating rates. The Rapid Radiative Transfer Model for GCMs (RRTM-G) is an accelerated version of RRTM that provides improved efficiency with minimal loss of accuracy for application to general circulation models. The latter divides the solar spectrum into 14 bands within which a total of 112 pseudo-monochromatic calculations are performed, and in the thermal infrared 16 bands are used within which 140 pseudo-monochromatic calculations are performed. RRTM-G is used in a number of general circulation models worldwide, such as that of the European Centre for Medium-Range Weather Forecasts.

== See also ==
- List of atmospheric radiative transfer codes
- Atmospheric radiative transfer codes
