= HITRAN =

Molecular spectroscopic database

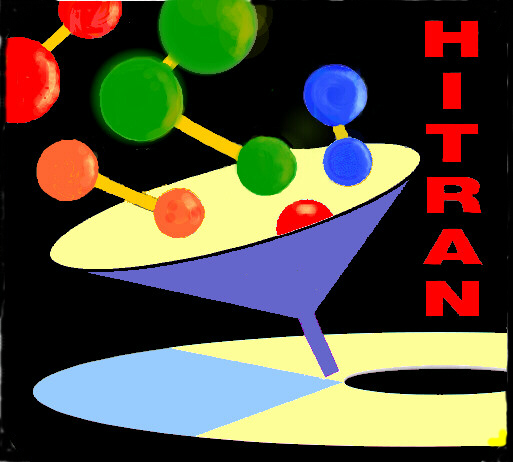
HITRAN logo, representing archiving of molecular transitions.

HITRAN (an acronym for High Resolution Transmission) molecular spectroscopic database is a compilation of spectroscopic parameters used to simulate and analyze the transmission and emission of light in gaseous media, with an emphasis on planetary atmospheres. The knowledge of spectroscopic parameters for transitions between energy levels in molecules (and atoms) is essential for interpreting and modeling the interaction of radiation (light) within different media.

For half a century, HITRAN has been considered to be an international standard which provides the user a recommended value of parameters for millions of transitions for different molecules. HITRAN includes both experimental and theoretical data which are gathered from a worldwide network of contributors as well as from articles, books, proceedings, databases, theses, reports, presentations, unpublished data, papers in-preparation and private communications. A major effort is then dedicated to evaluating and processing the spectroscopic data. A single transition in HITRAN has many parameters, including a default 160-byte fixed-width format used since HITRAN2004. Wherever possible, the retrieved data are validated against accurate laboratory data.

The original version of HITRAN was compiled by the US Air Force Cambridge Research Laboratories (1960s) in order to enable surveillance of military aircraft detected through the terrestrial atmosphere. One of the early applications of HITRAN was a program called Atmospheric Radiation Measurement (ARM) for the US Department of Energy. In this program spectral atmospheric measurements were made around the globe in order to better understand the balance between the radiant energy that reaches Earth from the sun and the energy that flows from Earth back out to space. The US Department of Transportation also utilized HITRAN in its early days for monitoring the gas emissions (NO, SO_{2}, NO_{2}) of super-sonic transports flying at high altitude. HITRAN was first made publicly available in 1973 and today there are a multitude of ongoing and future NASA satellite missions which incorporate HITRAN. One of the NASA missions currently utilizing HITRAN is the Orbiting Carbon Observatory (OCO) which measures the sources and sinks of CO_{2} in the global atmosphere. HITRAN is a free resource and is currently maintained and developed at the Center for Astrophysics | Harvard & Smithsonian, Cambridge MA, USA.

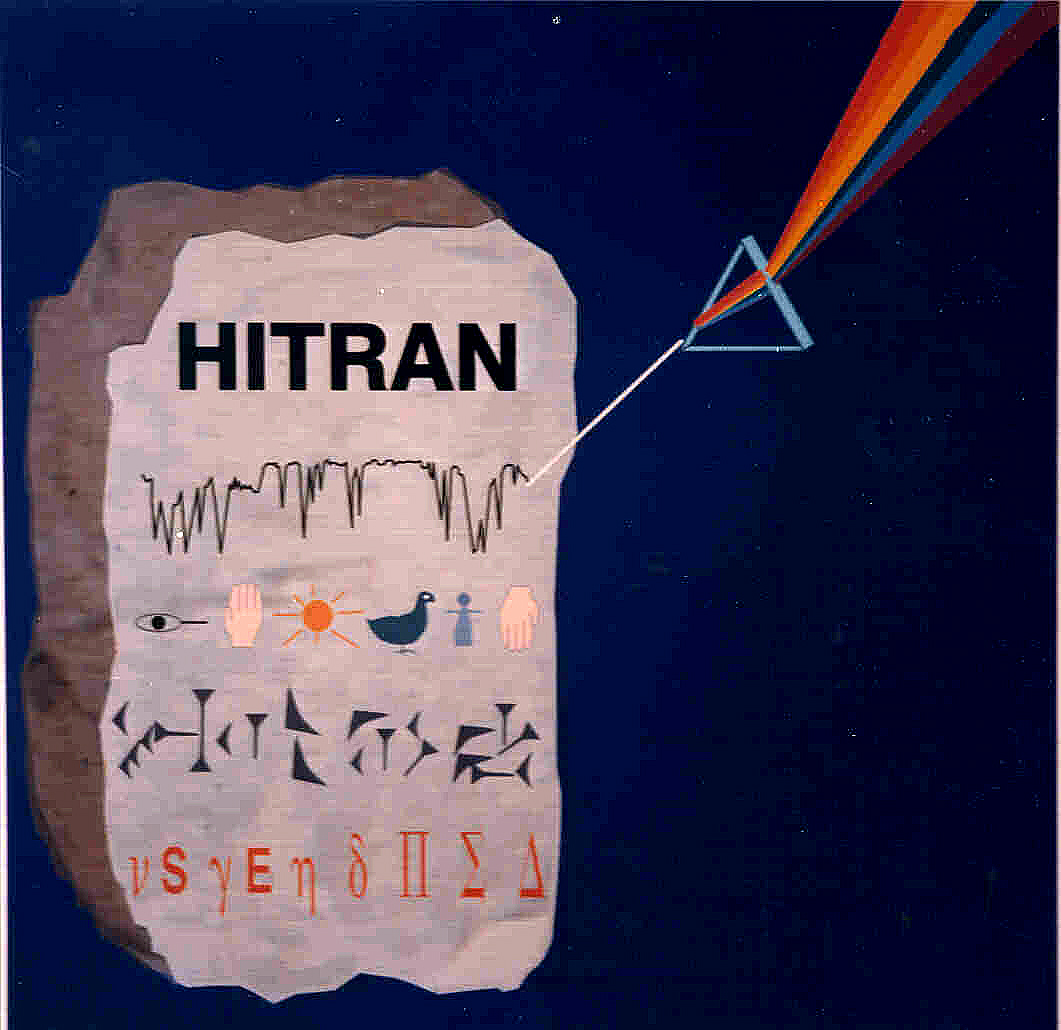
This image represents light being gathered via a prism onto an archival medium, in this case the "rosetta" stone (an abstraction of HITRAN) with an imprint of spectra, parameters etc.

HITRAN is the worldwide standard for calculating or simulating atmospheric molecular transmission and radiance from the microwave through ultraviolet region of the spectrum. The HITRAN database is officially released on a quadrennial basis, with updates posted in the intervening years on HITRANonline.There is a new journal article published in conjunction with the most recent release of the HITRAN database, and users are strongly encouraged to use the most recent edition. Throughout HITRAN's history, there have been around 50,000 unique users of the database and in recent years there are over 40,000 users registered on HITRANonline. There are YouTube tutorials on the HITRANonline webpage to answer frequently asked questions by users.

Calculated transmission spectra through four sample cells containing one atmosphere of each molecule at 296 K with the corresponding path length. Spectra have been calculated using the HITRAN2016 database and HAPI Python libraries. Credit: HITRAN Team

Data Available from HITRAN
Line-by-Line Transitions
Absorption Cross Sections
Collision Induced Absorption
MT_CKD Water Vapor Continuum
Aerosol Refractive Indices
HITEMP
HAPI
Supplemental data for radiative-transfer calculations

== Line-by-Line ==
The current version of the database, HITRAN2024, contains 61 molecules in the line-by-line portion of HITRAN along with some of their most significant isotopologues (156 isotopologues in total). These data are archived as a multitude of high-resolution line transitions, each containing many spectral parameters required for high-resolution simulations.

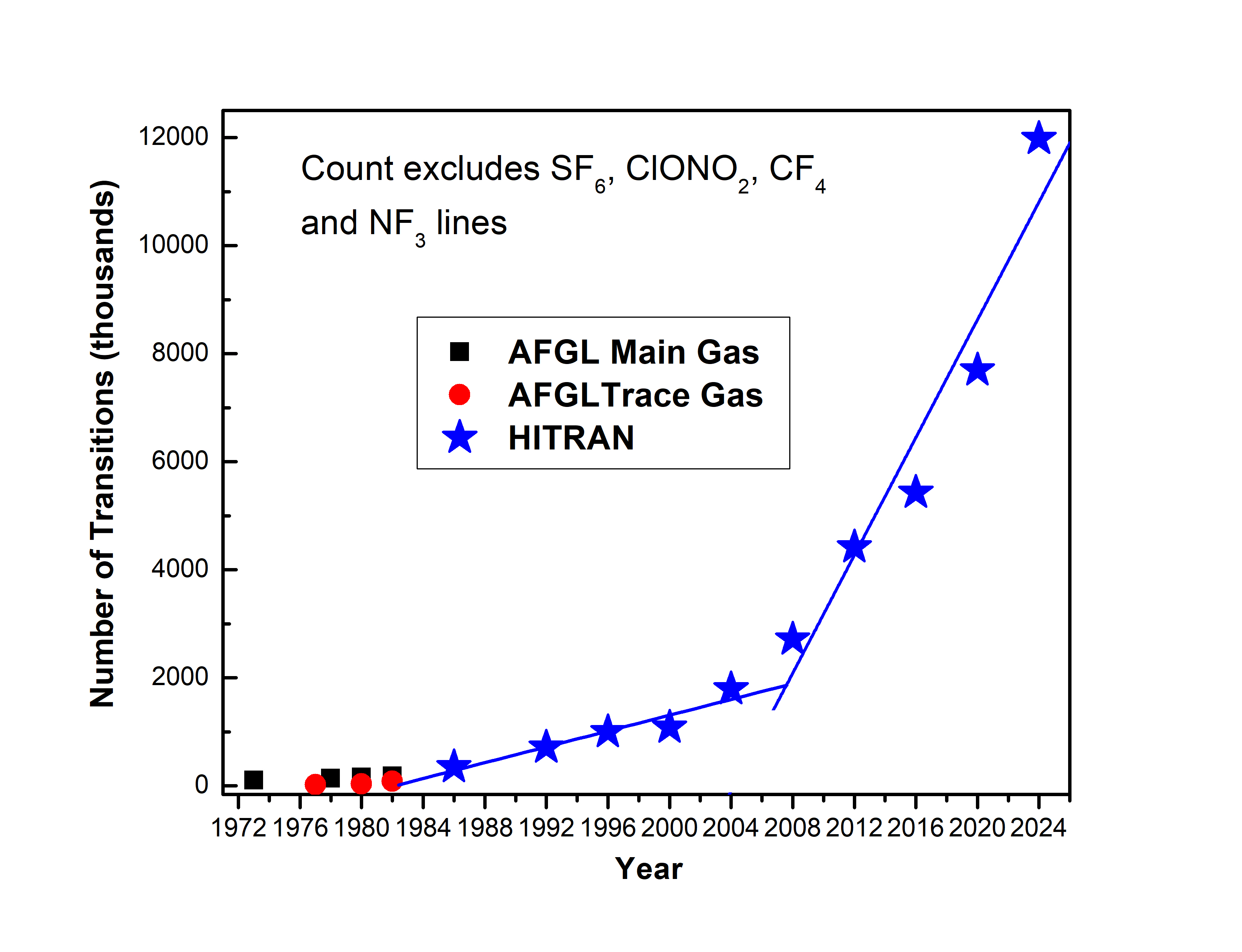
This image depicts the number of line-by-line transitions within HITRAN per year. AFGL values are atmospheric absorption line parameters. AFGL is an acronym for the Air Force Geophysical Laboratory Catalog, which was the predecessor of HITRAN. Credit: HITRAN Team

== Absorption Cross-Sections ==
In addition to the traditional line-by-line spectroscopic absorption parameters, the HITRAN database contains information on absorption cross-sections where the line-by-line parameters are absent or incomplete. Typically HITRAN includes absorption cross-sections for heavy polyatomic molecules (with low-lying vibrational modes) which are difficult for detailed analysis due to the high density of the spectral bands/lines, broadening effects, isomerization, and overall modeling complexity. There are 644 molecular species in the current edition of the database provided as cross-section files. The cross-section files are provided in the HITRAN format described on the official HITRAN website.

== Collision-Induced Absorption ==
The HITRAN compilation also provides collision-induced absorption (CIA) that was first introduced into HITRAN in the 2012 edition. CIA refers to absorption by transient electric dipoles induced by the interaction between colliding molecules. Instructions for accessing the CIA data files can be found on HITRAN/CIA.

== MT_CKD Water Vapor Continuum ==
The MT_CKD (Mlawer-Tobin-Clough-Kneizys-Davies) Water Vapor Continuum Model provides water vapor absorption coefficients that should be added to the local contributions of water vapor transitions, such as those available in the HITRAN line-by-line section, in order to obtain the total absorption due to water vapor. Compared to line absorption, the continuum absorption varies more slowly across the spectrum.

The MT_CKD Water Vapor Continuum provides absorption coefficients for both the self continuum (arising from interactions between water molecules) and the foreign continuum (arising from interactions between water vapor and other atmospheric gases). These coefficients are distributed in a netCDF file at a reference density corresponding to a pressure of 1013 mbar and temperature of 296 K for both the self and foreign continuum. This file also contains the temperature-dependence coefficients for the self continuum, allowing users to adjust the reference values for temperatures other than 296 K. The accompanying code performs the appropriate scaling and interpolation to compute the continuum absorption coefficients at arbitrary pressures, temperatures, and wavenumbers.

The MT_CKD Water Vapor Continuum Model is constrained to remain consistent with high-quality analyses of atmospheric and laboratory measurements. Keeping the MT_CKD continuum consistent with current observational studies requires periodic updates to the continuum coefficients. A record of revisions to the MT_CKD Water Vapor Continuum Model can be found on the model's GitHub page.

The associated code and data are available through the HITRAN website at hitran.org/mtckd and at the AER GitHub site at github.com/AER-RC/MT_CKD_H2O.

== Aerosol Refractive Indices ==
HITRAN2024 also has an aerosols refractive indices section, with data in the visible, infrared, and millimeter spectral ranges of many types of cloud and aerosol particles. Knowledge of the refractive indices of the aerosols and cloud particles and their size distributions is necessary in order to specify their optical properties.

== HITEMP ==
HITEMP is the molecular spectroscopic database analogous to HITRAN for high-temperature modeling of the spectra of molecules in the gas phase. HITEMP encompasses many more bands and transitions than HITRAN for eight absorbers: H_{2}O, CO_{2}, N_{2}O, CO, CH_{4}, NO, NO_{2} and OH. Due to the extremely large number of transitions required for high-temperature simulations, it was necessary to provide the HITEMP data as separate files to that of HITRAN. The HITEMP line lists retain the same 160-character format that was used for earlier editions of HITRAN. There are numerous applications for HITEMP data, some examples include the thermometry of high-temperature environments, analysis of combustion processes, and modeling spectra of atmospheres in the Solar System, exoplanets, brown dwarfs, and stars.

== HAPI ==
A Python library HAPI (HITRAN Application Programming Interface) has been developed which serves as a tool for absorption and transmission calculations as well as comparisons of spectroscopic data sets. HAPI extends the functionality of the main site, in particular, for the calculation of spectra using several types of line shape calculations, including the flexible HT (Hartmann-Tran) profile. This HT line shape can also be reduced to a number of conventional line profiles such as Gaussian (Doppler), Lorentzian, Voigt, Rautian, Speed-Dependent Voigt and Speed-Dependent Rautian. In addition to accounting for pressure, temperature and optical path length, the user can include a number of instrumental functions to simulate experimental spectra. HAPI is able to account for broadening of lines due to mixtures of gases as well as make use of all broadening parameters supplied by HITRAN. This includes the traditional broadeners (air, self) as well as additional parameters for CO_{2}, H_{2}O, H_{2} and He broadening. The following spectral functions can be calculated in the current version #1 of HAPI:

- absorption coefficient
- absorption spectrum
- transmittance spectrum
- radiance spectrum

HAPIEST (an acronym for HITRAN Application Programming Interface and Efficient Spectroscopic Tools) is a graphical user interface allowing users to access some of the functionality provided by HAPI without any knowledge of Python programming, including downloading data from HITRAN, and plotting of spectra and cross-sections. The source code for HAPIEST is available on GitHub (HAPIEST), along with binary distributions for Mac and PC.

== See also ==
- Atmospheric radiative--transfer codes
- Absorption spectrum
- MODTRAN
