= MODTRAN =

Computer program

MODTRAN (MODerate resolution atmospheric TRANsmission) is a computer program designed to model atmospheric propagation of electromagnetic radiation for the 100-50,000 cm^{−1} (0.2 to 100 μm) spectral range. This covers the spectrum from middle ultraviolet to visible light to far infrared.

The most recently released version of the code, MODTRAN6, provides a spectral resolution of 0.2 cm^{−1} using its 0.1 cm^{−1} band model algorithm.

Some aspects of MODTRAN are patented by Spectral Sciences, Inc. and the US Air Force, who have shared development responsibility for the code and related radiation transfer science collaboratively since 1987. The acronym MODTRAN was registered as a trademark of the US Government, represented by the US Air Force, in 2008.

All MODTRAN code development and maintenance is currently performed by Spectral Sciences while the Air Force handles code validation and verification. MODTRAN6 may be obtained from Spectral Sciences, Inc.

MODTRAN is written entirely in FORTRAN. MODTRAN6 adds support for JSON formatted input files, along with a graphical user interface that enables users to load existing cases, interactively enter or modify inputs, save their JSON formatted input files, run MODTRAN6, and graphically view the newly generated spectral output data. Third parties, including Ontar, have also developed graphical user interfaces for MODTRAN in order to facilitate user interaction and ease of use.

== See also ==
- HITRAN - a compilation of spectroscopic parameters
- List of atmospheric radiative transfer codes
- SMARTS - Simple Model of the Atmospheric Radiative Transfer of Sunshine
