= Method of continued fractions =

The method of continued fractions is a method developed specifically for solution of integral equations of quantum scattering theory like Lippmann–Schwinger equation or Faddeev equations. It was invented by Horáček and Sasakawa in 1983. The goal of the method is to solve the integral equation

$$|\psi\rangle = |\phi\rangle + G_0 V|\psi\rangle$$

iteratively and to construct convergent continued fraction for the T-matrix

$$T= \langle \phi |V |\psi\rangle .$$

The method has two variants. In the first one (denoted as MCFV) we construct approximations of the potential energy operator $V$ in the form of separable function of rank 1, 2, 3 ... The second variant (MCFG method) constructs the finite rank approximations to Green's operator. The approximations are constructed within Krylov subspace constructed from vector $|\phi\rangle$ with action of the operator $A=G_0 V$. The method can thus be understood as resummation of (in general divergent) Born series by Padé approximants. It is also closely related to Schwinger variational principle. In general the method requires similar amount of numerical work as calculation of terms of Born series, but it provides much faster convergence of the results.

== Algorithm of MCFV ==
The derivation of the method proceeds as follows. First we introduce rank-one (separable) approximation to the potential

$$V = \frac{V|\phi\rangle\langle\phi|V}{\langle\phi|V|\phi\rangle} + V_1 .$$

The integral equation for the rank-one part of potential is easily soluble. The full solution of the original problem can therefore be expressed as

$$|\psi\rangle = |\phi\rangle + \frac{T}{\langle\phi|V|\phi\rangle}|\psi_1\rangle, \qquad T = \frac{\langle\phi|V|\phi\rangle^2}{\langle\phi|V|\phi\rangle-\langle\phi|V|\psi_1\rangle},$$

in terms of new function $|\psi_1\rangle$. This function is solution of modified Lippmann–Schwinger equation

$$|\psi_1\rangle = |\phi_1\rangle + G_0 V_1|\psi_1\rangle ,$$

with $|\phi_1\rangle = G_0 V|\phi\rangle .$ The remainder potential term $V_1$ is transparent for incoming wave

$$V_1|\phi\rangle = \langle\phi|V_1 =0 ,$$

i. e. it is weaker operator than the original one. The new problem thus obtained for $|\psi_1\rangle$ is of the same form as the original one and we can repeat the procedure. This leads to recurrent relations

$$V_i = V_{i-1}-\frac{V_{i-1}|\phi_{i-1}\rangle\langle\phi_{i-1}|V_{i-1}}{\langle\phi_{i-1}|V_{i-1}|\phi_{i-1}\rangle}$$
$$|\phi_i\rangle = G_0 V_{i-1}|\phi_{i-1}\rangle .$$

It is possible to show that the T-matrix of the original problem can be expressed in the form of chain fraction

$$T = \cfrac{\beta_0^2}{\beta_0-\gamma_1 - \cfrac{\beta_1^2}{\beta_1 - \gamma_2 - \cfrac{\beta_2^2}{\beta_2 - \gamma_3 - \ddots }}},$$

where we defined

$$\beta_i = \langle\phi_{i-1}|V_{i-1}|\phi_{i-1}\rangle , \qquad \gamma_i = \langle\phi_{i-1}|V_{i-1}|\phi_{i}\rangle.$$

In practical calculation the infinite chain fraction is replaced by finite one assuming that

$$\beta_N = \beta_{N+1}=\dots=0 , \qquad \gamma_N = \gamma_{N+1}=\dots=0.$$

This is equivalent to assuming that the remainder solution

$$|\psi_N\rangle = |\phi_N\rangle + G_0 V_N|\psi_N\rangle ,$$

is negligible. This is plausible assumption, since the remainder potential $V_N$ has all vectors $|\phi_i\rangle, i=0,1,\ldots,N-1$ in its null space and it can be shown that this potential converges to zero and the chain fraction converges to the exact T-matrix.

== Algorithm of MCFG ==
The second variant of the method construct the approximations to the Green's operator

$$G_{i+1} = G_i-\frac{|\phi_{i+1}\rangle\langle\phi_{i+1}|}{\langle\phi_{i}|V|\phi_{i+1}\rangle},$$

now with vectors

$$|\phi_{i+1}\rangle=G_iV|\phi_i\rangle.$$

The chain fraction for T-matrix now also holds, with little bit different definition of coefficients $\beta_i, \gamma_i$.

== Properties and relation to other methods ==
The expressions for the T-matrix resulting from both methods can be related to certain class of variational principles. In the case of first iteration of MCFV method we get the same result as from Schwinger variational principle with trial function $|\psi\rangle = |\phi\rangle$. The higher iterations with N-terms in the continuous fraction reproduce exactly 2N terms (2N + 1) of Born series for the MCFV (or MCFG) method respectively. The method was tested on calculation of collisions of electrons from hydrogen atom in static-exchange approximation. In this case the method reproduces exact results for scattering cross-section on 6 significant digits in 4 iterations. It can also be shown that both methods reproduce exactly the solution of the Lippmann-Schwinger equation with the potential given by finite-rank operator. The number of iterations is then equal to the rank of the potential. The method has been successfully used for solution of problems in both nuclear and molecular physics.
