= 4C +48.48 =

Radio galaxy in the constellation Cygnus

Observation data (J2000 epoch)
- Constellation: Cygnus
- Right ascension: 19h 33m 05.266s
- Declination: +48d 11m41.83s
- Redshift: 2.343000
- Heliocentric radial velocity: 702,414 km/s
- Distance: 11 billion light-years (light travel distance) - 19 billion light years (present comoving distance)
- Apparent magnitude (B): 0.31
- Absolute magnitude (V): 0.23
- Notable features: Radio galaxy

Other designations
- NVSS J193305+481140, PGC 2821049, MG4 J193305+4811, TXS 1931+480, 6C B193140.4+480508

4C +48.48 is a radio galaxy located in the constellation Cygnus. At the redshift of 2.343, it is one of the most distant galaxies ever seen, since light has taken at least 11 billion light-years to reach Earth.

== History ==
4C +48.48 is believed to be a precursor of today's brightest cluster galaxies and an important probe of galaxy evolution. It is one of the many high- redshift powerful radio galaxies to show recent detections of strong emission lines at observed wavelengths which a new diagnostic tool is provided to study the objects, although the nature of line emission is a debate subject. Part of the difficulty might be due the usage of standard optical emission-line ratios commonly used differentiate between thermal ionization and low or high-excitation ionization from a nonthermal source, has until recently been problematic because rest frame optical emission from galaxies at z > 1 is redshifted to near-infrared wavelengths at current epochs.

Using a new generation of infrared spectrograph, it made it possible to begin systematic studies of the dominant ionization mechanisms in these galaxies via their rest frame optical emission-line spectra. In particular, using the new K-Band on the University of Hawaii 2.2 m telescope on Mauna Kea, provides the unique capability of simultaneous coverage of the 1.02.4 m wavelength band at typical spectral resolution / 700, while the infrared spectrograph (CGS4) on the 3.8 m United Kingdom Infrared Telescope (UKIRT) on Mauna Kea can provide coverage of either the full J-, H-, or K-band near-infrared windows at a spectral resolution of / 860.

== Further study on 4C +48.48 ==
A study conducted on 4C +48.48 in 2001, shows that although its dormant ionization mechanism is photoionized by its central active galactic nucleus, there is evidence of another mechanism which is located within the off-nuclear emission of each source. Through measuring [O II], [Ne III] and [O III] for several regions in 4C +48.48, this suggests shock ionization in one region.

Further observations from PPAK bundle of the PMAS spectrograph that is mounted on the 3.5m on the Calar Alto Observatory, show there various emission lines are detected within this wavelength range for 4C +48.48, including Lyα (1216 Å), NV (1240 Å), CIV (1549 Å), HeII (1640 Å), OIII] (1663 Å) and CIII] (1909 Å). The Ly, CIV and HeII emission lines in 4C +48.48 shows a striking morphology, which they extend several arcseconds towards the north-east section, in close alignment with the radio source. However, on the other side of the nucleus, the alignment is not present, but the south-western radio source undergoes a dramatic 45 deg bend to the south, with its line emission extends ~5 " (40 kpc) from the nucleus towards the west. The CIV and HeII lines show a similar spatial distribution to that of Ly.

The properties above, suggests 4C +48.48 is embedded inside a large ionized gas nebula where Lyα emission is extended across ~100 kpc or more. Not to mention, there is a band of low Lyα/CIV that is running perpendicular to its radio axis, to the location of its active nucleus. This might be a feature of an observed signature on an edge-on disk of neutral gas.

Weaker lines are also detected through the deep spectra of 4C +48.48. Based on comparisons between its various ionization models and emission line ratios, the line emitting gas is found to be enriched with metals, in which is further ionized by its hard radiation field of its active nucleus.

From another research, which using deep spectroscopy of the ultraviolet (UV) line and continuum emission obtained from KECK II and the Very Large Telescope, they were able to investigate the nature of jet-gas interactions in 4C +48.48. From the investigation, the kinematically perturbed gas is found to be blueshifted in respect to the kinematically quiescent gas, spatially expended and detected on both sides of the nucleus. This is proposed that the perturbed gas is part of jet-induced outflow, with dust on the far side of the object, obscuring the outflowing gas. The spatial extent of the blueshifted perturbed gas is typically ~35 kpc, implying the dust is spatially extended on similar spatial scales.
