= Schwinger variational principle =

Schwinger variational principle is a variational principle which expresses the scattering T-matrix as a functional depending on two unknown wave functions. The functional attains stationary value equal to actual scattering T-matrix. The functional is stationary if and only if the two functions satisfy the Lippmann-Schwinger equation. The development of the variational formulation of the scattering theory can be traced to works of L. Hultén and J. Schwinger in 1940s.

== Linear form of the functional ==
The T-matrix expressed in the form of stationary value of the functional reads

$$\langle\phi'|T(E)|\phi\rangle = T[\psi',\psi] \equiv
\langle\psi'|V|\phi\rangle + \langle\phi'|V|\psi\rangle - \langle\psi'|V-VG_0^{(+)}(E)V|\psi\rangle ,$$

where $\phi$ and $\phi'$ are the initial and the final states respectively, $V$ is the interaction potential and $G_0^{(+)}(E)$ is the retarded Green's operator for collision energy $E$. The condition for the stationary value of the functional is that the functions $\psi$ and $\psi'$ satisfy the Lippmann-Schwinger equation

$$|\psi\rangle = |\phi\rangle + G_0^{(+)}(E)V|\psi\rangle$$

and

$$|\psi'\rangle = |\phi'\rangle + G_0^{(-)}(E)V|\psi'\rangle .$$

== Fractional form of the functional ==
Different form of the stationary principle for T-matrix reads

$$\langle\phi'|T(E)|\phi\rangle = T[\psi',\psi] \equiv
\frac{\langle\psi'|V|\phi\rangle\langle\phi'|V|\psi\rangle}{\langle\psi'|(V-VG_0^{(+)}(E)V)|\psi\rangle}.$$

The wave functions $\psi$ and $\psi'$ must satisfy the same Lippmann-Schwinger equations to get the stationary value.

== Application of the principle ==
The principle may be used for the calculation of the scattering amplitude in the similar way like the variational principle for bound states, i.e. the form of the wave functions $\psi, \psi'$ is guessed, with some free parameters, that are determined from the condition of stationarity of the functional.

== See also ==
- Lippmann–Schwinger equation
- Quantum scattering theory
- T-matrix method
- Green's operator

== Bibliography ==
- Newton, Roger G. (2002). Scattering Theory of Waves and Particles. Dover Publications, inc. ISBN 978-0-486-42535-1.
- Taylor, John R. (1972). Scattering Theory: The Quantum Theory on Nonrelativistic Collisions. John Wiley. ISBN 978-0-471-84900-1.
- Schwinger, Julian (1947), Harward University lectures (unpublished)
- Schwinger, J. (1947). "Minutes of the Meeting at Stanford University, California July 11-12, 1947". Phys. Rev. 72 (8): 742. Bibcode:1947PhRv...72..738.. doi:10.1103/PhysRev.72.738.
- Lippmann, B. A.; Schwinger, J. (1950). "Variational Principles for Scattering Processes. I". Phys. Rev. 79 (3): 469–480. Bibcode:1950PhRv...79..469L. doi:10.1103/physrev.79.469.
