= Jiří Horáček =

Czech physicist

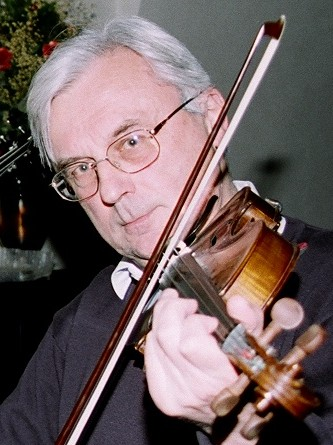
- Born: February 2, 1945 (age 81); Nová Paka, Czech Republic
- Known for: Method of continued fractions
- Scientific career
- Fields: Theoretical physics
- Workplaces: Charles University in Prague; Tohoku University
- Doctoral advisor: Jozef Kvasnica

Prof. RNDr. Jiří Horáček, DrSc. (* February 2, 1945 in Nová Paka) is a Czech theoretical physicist, professor at Charles University in Prague, where he works at the Institute of Theoretical Physics, which is a part of the Faculty of Mathematics and Physics. He was the director of the Institute in 2003–2011. He works in the field of theoretical atomic and molecular physics with a special focus on numerical solutions to integral and differential equations of scattering theory and on numerical analytic continuation methods localizing the poles of scattering quantities related to resonances.

== Life ==
Jiří Horáček spent his early life in Nová Paka. His mother Marta Horáčková (née Pátá) was a music teacher. In early youth he started playing violin. His teacher was a famous music virtuoso Josef Muzika. Although Jiří Horáček later pursued a different subject, violin has always been an important part of his life and he performs regularly with a music group Four and a Half or with friends. Every year he performs in Czech Christmas Mass.

In 1963 he started studying physics at Charles University in Prague. He graduated in theoretical physics, defending his diploma thesis on electron-atom collisions under the supervision of Jozef Kvasnica. After one year of compulsory military service in Czechoslovak People's Army he began his doctoral studies at the Department of Theoretical Physics, Faculty of Mathematics and Physics, Charles University in Prague. He defended his doctoral thesis in 1972 and his candidate thesis (the then equivalent of PhD) in 1975. It was during this time that he met his future wife, physician Eva Plchová, whom he married in 1974. They have two daughters Jitka (1975) and Olga (1978). After finishing his doctoral studies he got an assistant position at the Department. In 1979–1981 he completed a postdoc fellowship at Tohoku University in Sendai, Japan, working with Professor Tatuya Sasakawa on the theory of collisional processes in nuclear and atomic physics. During his stay in Japan Jiří Horáček also devoted a lot of time to karate; he has a black belt (1st dan) in Shotokan Karate-Do. After returning to Czechoslovakia he also practiced karate in the Slavoj Hloubětín sports club.

After the Velvet Revolution in 1989 opportunity opened up for him to travel as a visiting professor to the University of Southern California in Los Angeles and to the Technical University of Munich. In 1997 Jiří Horáček was awarded a full professorship at Charles University in Prague. In 2003–2011 he was the head of the Institute of Theoretical Physics.

== Scientific work ==
The main topic of Jiří Horáček's scientific work is the application of quantum scattering theory to nuclear, atomic, and molecular physics. His work mainly focused on the development of efficient methods facilitating numerical solutions of integral equations appearing in the scattering theory, particularly the Lippmann-Schwinger equation. His application of the method of continued fractions developed together with Tatuya Sasakawa during Jiří's fellowship at Tohoku University is still used in nuclear, atomic, and molecular physics. In 1991 he modified the method together with Lorenz S. Cederbaum and Hans-Dieter Meyer from Heidelberg University and they developed the Schwinger-Lanczos method, which Jiří applied to calculations of electron-molecule collisions and ion-atom collisions together with his students and with Professor Wolfgang Domcke from the Technical University of Munich. They calculated the scattering cross-sections for the processes of vibrational excitation, dissociative attachment, and associative detachment in slow electron collisions with various diatomic molecules. Additionally, Jiří Horáček developed methods of calculating scattering phase shifts, resonance parameters, low-energy expansions in the scattering theory, and solutions of the inverse scattering problem.

== Awards ==
In 1986 he was awarded the Czech Literature Fund prize for his scientific work and in 2011 he won an honorary medal from the Faculty of Mathematics and Physics, Charles University in Prague for his long-standing scientific and pedagogical work.

== Selected publications ==
Jiří Horáček authored almost 100 publications in the fields of theoretical physics and numerical mathematics, including:

- Horáček, J.; Sasakawa, T. (1983), "Method of continued fractions with applications to atomic physics", Phys. Rev. A, 28 (4): 2151–2156, Bibcode:1983PhRvA..28.2151H, doi:10.1103/PhysRevA.28.2151
- Horáček, J.; Sasakawa, T. (1984), "Method of continued fractions with applications to atomic physics. II", Phys. Rev. A, 30 (5): 2274–2277, Bibcode:1984PhRvA..30.2274H, doi:10.1103/PhysRevA.30.2274
- Horáček, J.; Sasakawa, T. (1985), "Method of continued fractions for on- and off-shell t matrix of local and nonlocal potentials", Phys. Rev. C, 32 (1): 70–75, Bibcode:1985PhRvC..32...70H, doi:10.1103/PhysRevC.32.70, PMID 9952803
- Meyer, H.-D.; Horáček, J.; Cederbaum, L.S. (1991), "Schwinger and anomaly-free Kohn variational principles and a generalized Lanczos algorithm for nonsymmetric operators", Phys. Rev. A, 43 (7): 3587–3596, Bibcode:1991PhRvA..43.3587M, doi:10.1103/PhysRevA.43.3587, PMID 9905446
- Horáček, J.; et al. (2004), "Dissociative electron attachment and vibrational excitation of H_{2} by low-energy electrons: Calculations based on an improved nonlocal resonance model", Phys. Rev. A, 70 (5) 052712, Bibcode:2004PhRvA..70e2712H, doi:10.1103/PhysRevA.70.052712
- Horáček, J.; et al. (2006), "Dissociative electron attachment and vibrational excitation of H_{2} by low-energy electrons: Calculations based on an improved nonlocal resonance model. II. Vibrational excitation", Phys. Rev. A, 73 (2) 022701, Bibcode:2006PhRvA..73b2701H, doi:10.1103/PhysRevA.73.022701

He has also coauthored the book

- Kukulin, V. I.; Krasnopol'sky, V. M.; Horáček, J. (1989). Theory of Resonances, Principles and Applications. Reidel Texts in the Mathematical Sciences. Springer-Science+Business Media, B.V. ISBN 978-90-481-8432-3.

and two chapters in

- Čársky, P.; Čurík, R., eds. (2012). Low-Energy Electron Scattering from Molecules, Biomolecules and Surfaces (CRC 2012). Boca Raton: CRC Press.

== Biography ==
- Michael Třeštík, editor: Kdo je kdo v České republice na přelomu 20. století. AGENTURA KDO JE KDO, Praha 1998, str. 198.
