= Lippmann–Schwinger equation =

Equation used in quantum scattering problems

The Lippmann–Schwinger equation (named after Bernard Lippmann and Julian Schwinger) is one of the most used equations to describe elastic particle collisions – or, more precisely, scattering – in quantum mechanics. It may be used in scattering of molecules, atoms, neutrons, photons or any other particles and is important mainly in atomic, molecular, and optical physics, nuclear physics and particle physics, but also for seismic scattering problems in geophysics. It relates the scattered wave function with the interaction that produces the scattering (the scattering potential) and therefore allows calculation of the relevant experimental parameters (scattering amplitude and cross sections).

The most fundamental equation to describe any quantum phenomenon, including scattering, is the Schrödinger equation. In physical problems, this differential equation must be solved with the input of an additional set of initial and/or boundary conditions for the specific physical system studied. The Lippmann–Schwinger equation is equivalent to the Schrödinger equation plus the typical boundary conditions for scattering problems. In order to embed the boundary conditions, the Lippmann–Schwinger equation must be written as an integral equation. For scattering problems, the Lippmann–Schwinger equation is often more convenient than the original Schrödinger equation.

The Lippmann–Schwinger equation is:
$$| \psi \rangle = | \phi \rangle + \frac{1}{E - H_0 + i \epsilon} V |\psi \rangle. \,$$

The potential energy $V$ describes the interaction between the two colliding systems. The Hamiltonian $H_0$ describes the situation in which the two systems are infinitely far apart and do not interact. Its eigenfunctions are $| \phi \rangle \,$ and its eigenvalues are the energies $E \,$. Finally, $i \epsilon \,$ is a mathematical technicality necessary for the calculation of the integrals needed to solve the equation. It is a consequence of causality, ensuring that scattered waves consist only of outgoing waves. This is made rigorous by the limiting absorption principle.

== Usage ==
The Lippmann–Schwinger equation is useful in a very large number of situations involving two-body scattering. For three or more colliding bodies it does not work well because of mathematical limitations; Faddeev equations may be used instead. However, there are approximations that can reduce a many-body problem to a set of two-body problems in a variety of cases. For example, in a collision between electrons and molecules, there may be tens or hundreds of particles involved. But the phenomenon may be reduced to a two-body problem by describing all the molecule constituent particle potentials together with a pseudopotential. In these cases, the Lippmann–Schwinger equations may be used. Of course, the main motivations of these approaches are also the possibility of doing the calculations with much lower computational efforts.

== Derivation ==
We will assume that the Hamiltonian may be written as
$$H = H_0 + V$$
where H_{0} is the free Hamiltonian (or more generally, a Hamiltonian with known eigenvectors). For example, in nonrelativistic quantum mechanics H_{0} may be
$$H_0 = \frac{p^2}{2m}.$$

Intuitively V is the interaction energy of the system. Let there be an eigenstate of H_{0}:
$$H_0 | \phi \rangle = E | \phi \rangle.$$

The Schrödinger equation for the full hamiltonian $H$ reads
$$\left( H_0 + V \right) | \psi \rangle = E | \psi \rangle$$

with the same energy as that of $H_0$ because $H_0$ describes the particle in the distant past (before the collision takes place) and the process is assumed elastic. Now consider the Hellmann–Feynman theorem, which requires the energy eigenvalues of the Hamiltonian to change continuously with continuous changes in the Hamiltonian. Therefore, we wish that $| \psi \rangle \to | \phi \rangle$ as $V \to 0$. A naive solution to this equation would be
$$| \psi \rangle = | \phi \rangle + \frac{1}{E - H_0} V | \psi \rangle.$$
where the notation 1/A denotes the inverse of A. However E − H_{0} is singular since E is an eigenvalue of H_{0}. As is described below, this singularity is eliminated in two distinct ways by making the denominator slightly complex:
$$| \psi^{(\pm)} \rangle = | \phi \rangle + \frac{1}{E - H_0 \pm i \epsilon} V |\psi^{(\pm)} \rangle.$$

By insertion of a complete set of free particle states,
$$| \psi^{(\pm)} \rangle = | \phi \rangle + \int d\beta\frac{|\phi_\beta\rangle}{E - E_\beta \pm i \epsilon} \langle \phi_\beta |V|\psi^{(\pm)} \rangle, \quad H_0 |\phi_\beta\rangle = E_\beta|\phi_\beta\rangle,$$

the Schrödinger equation is turned into an integral equation. The "in" (+) and "out" (−) states are assumed to form bases too, in the distant past and distant future respectively having the appearance of free particle states, but being eigenfunctions of the complete Hamiltonian. Thus endowing them with an index, the equation becomes
$$| \psi^{(\pm)}_\alpha \rangle = | \phi_\alpha \rangle + \int d\beta\frac{T^{(\pm)}_{\beta\alpha}|\phi_\beta\rangle}{E_\alpha - E_\beta \pm i \epsilon}, \quad T^{(\pm)}_{\beta\alpha} = \langle \phi_\beta |V|\psi^{(\pm)}_\alpha \rangle.$$

== Methods of solution ==
From the mathematical point of view the Lippmann–Schwinger equation in coordinate representation is an integral equation of Fredholm type. It can be solved by discretization. Since it is equivalent to the differential time-independent Schrödinger equation with appropriate boundary conditions, it can also be solved by numerical methods for differential equations. In the case of the spherically symmetric potential $V$ it is usually solved by partial wave analysis. For high energies and/or weak potential it can also be solved perturbatively by means of Born series. Another method that is convenient in the case of many-body physics, like in description of atomic, nuclear or molecular collisions, is the R-matrix method of Wigner and Eisenbud. Another class of methods is based on separable expansion of the potential or Green's operator like the method of continued fractions of Horáček and Sasakawa. Very important class of methods is based on variational principles, for example the Schwinger-Lanczos method combining the variational principle of Schwinger with Lanczos algorithm.

== Interpretation as in and out states ==
=== The S-matrix paradigm ===
In the S-matrix formulation of particle physics, which was pioneered by John Archibald Wheeler among others, all physical processes are modeled according to the following paradigm.

One begins with a non-interacting multiparticle state in the distant past. Non-interacting does not mean that all of the forces have been turned off, in which case for example protons would fall apart, but rather that there exists an interaction-free Hamiltonian H_{0}, for which the bound states have the same energy level spectrum as the actual Hamiltonian H. This initial state is referred to as the in state. Intuitively, it consists of elementary particles or bound states that are sufficiently well separated that their interactions with each other are ignored.

The idea is that whatever physical process one is trying to study may be modeled as a scattering process of these well separated bound states. This process is described by the full Hamiltonian H, but once it's over, all of the new elementary particles and new bound states separate again and one finds a new noninteracting state called the out state. The S-matrix is more symmetric under relativity than the Hamiltonian, because it does not require a choice of time slices to define.

This paradigm allows one to calculate the probabilities of all of the processes that we have observed in 70 years of particle collider experiments with remarkable accuracy. But many interesting physical phenomena do not obviously fit into this paradigm. For example, if one wishes to consider the dynamics inside of a neutron star sometimes one wants to know more than what it will finally decay into. In other words, one may be interested in measurements that are not in the asymptotic future. Sometimes an asymptotic past or future is not even available. For example, it is very possible that there is no past before the Big Bang.

In the 1960s, the S-matrix paradigm was elevated by many physicists to a fundamental law of nature. In S-matrix theory, it was stated that any quantity that one could measure should be found in the S-matrix for some process. This idea was inspired by the physical interpretation that S-matrix techniques could give to Feynman diagrams restricted to the mass-shell, and led to the construction of dual resonance models. But it was very controversial, because it denied the validity of quantum field theory based on local fields and Hamiltonians.

=== The connection to Lippmann–Schwinger ===
Intuitively, the slightly deformed eigenfunctions $\psi^{(\pm)}$ of the full Hamiltonian H are the in and out states. The $\phi$ are noninteracting states that resemble the in and out states in the infinite past and infinite future.

=== Creating wavepackets ===
This intuitive picture is not quite right, because $\psi^{(\pm)}$ is an eigenfunction of the Hamiltonian and so at different times only differs by a phase. Thus, in particular, the physical state does not evolve and so it cannot become noninteracting. This problem is easily circumvented by assembling $\psi^{(\pm)}$ and $\phi$ into wavepackets with some distribution $g(E)$ of energies $E$ over a characteristic scale $\Delta E$. The uncertainty principle now allows the interactions of the asymptotic states to occur over a timescale $\hbar/\Delta E$ and in particular it is no longer inconceivable that the interactions may turn off outside of this interval. The following argument suggests that this is indeed the case.

Plugging the Lippmann–Schwinger equations into the definitions
$$\psi^{(\pm)}_g(t)=\int dE\, e^{-iEt} g(E)\psi^{(\pm)}$$
and
$$\phi_g(t)=\int dE\, e^{-iEt} g(E)\phi$$
of the wavepackets we see that, at a given time, the difference between the $\psi_g(t)$ and $\phi_g(t)$ wavepackets is given by an integral over the energy E.

=== A contour integral ===
This integral may be evaluated by defining the wave function over the complex E plane and closing the E contour using a semicircle on which the wavefunctions vanish. The integral over the closed contour may then be evaluated, using the Cauchy integral theorem, as a sum of the residues at the various poles. We will now argue that the residues of $\psi^{(\pm)}$ approach those of $\phi$ at time $t \to \mp\infty$ and so the corresponding wavepackets are equal at temporal infinity.

In fact, for very positive times t the $e^{-iEt}$ factor in a Schrödinger picture state forces one to close the contour on the lower half-plane. The pole in the $(\phi ,V \psi^{\pm})$ from the Lippmann–Schwinger equation reflects the time-uncertainty of the interaction, while that in the wavepacket's weight function reflects the duration of the interaction. Both of these varieties of poles occur at finite imaginary energies and so are suppressed at very large times. The pole in the energy difference in the denominator is on the upper half-plane in the case of $\psi^{-}$, and so does not lie inside the integral contour and does not contribute to the $\psi^{-}$ integral. The remainder is equal to the $\phi$ wavepacket. Thus, at very late times $\psi^{-}=\phi$, identifying $\psi^{-}$ as the asymptotic noninteracting out state.

Similarly one may integrate the wavepacket corresponding to $\psi^{+}$ at very negative times. In this case the contour needs to be closed over the upper half-plane, which therefore misses the energy pole of $\psi^{+}$, which is in the lower half-plane. One then finds that the $\psi^{+}$ and $\phi$ wavepackets are equal in the asymptotic past, identifying $\psi^{+}$ as the asymptotic noninteracting in state.

=== The complex denominator of Lippmann–Schwinger ===
This identification of the $\psi$'s as asymptotic states is the justification for the $\pm\epsilon$ in the denominator of the Lippmann–Schwinger equations.

== A formula for the S-matrix ==
The S-matrix is defined to be the inner product
$$S_{ab} = (\psi^-_a, \psi^+_b)$$
of the ath and bth Heisenberg picture asymptotic states. One may obtain a formula relating the S-matrix to the potential V using the above contour integral strategy, but this time switching the roles of $\psi^+$ and $\psi^-$. As a result, the contour now does pick up the energy pole. This can be related to the $\phi$'s if one uses the S-matrix to swap the two $\psi$'s. Identifying the coefficients of the $\phi$'s on both sides of the equation one finds the desired formula relating S to the potential
$$S_{ab} = \delta(a-b) - 2i\pi \delta(E_a-E_b) (\phi_a, V\psi^+_b).$$

In the Born approximation, corresponding to first order perturbation theory, one replaces this last $\psi^+$ with the corresponding eigenfunction $\phi$ of the free Hamiltonian H_{0}, yielding
$$S_{ab}=\delta(a-b)-2i\pi\delta(E_a-E_b)(\phi_a,V\phi_b)\,$$
which expresses the S-matrix entirely in terms of V and free Hamiltonian eigenfunctions.

These formulas may in turn be used to calculate the reaction rate of the process $b \to a$, which is equal to $|S_{ab} - \delta_{ab}|^2.$

== Homogenization ==
With the use of Green's function, the Lippmann–Schwinger equation has counterparts in homogenization theory (e.g. mechanics, conductivity, permittivity).

== Lippmann–Schwinger Equation for Acoustic Waves ==
A time-dependent acoustic source of finite spatial support located at position $x_s$ generates a pressure field $p^s(t,x)$ governed by

$[\,\partial_t^2 - c^2(x)\,\Delta\,]\,p^s(t,x) = f(t)\,\delta_{x_s}(x),$

where $c(x)$ denotes the spatially varying sound speed and $f(t)$ the source pulse. Define the time-convolved field

$p^s_c(t,x) := -\,f'(-\!\cdot)\,\star_t\,p^s(\cdot,x),$

which satisfies a similar wave equation driven by the even pulse $F(t)=f(-t)\star_t f(t)$:

$[\,\partial_t^2 - c^2(x)\,\Delta\,]\,p^s_c(t,x) = F'(t)\,\delta_{x_s}(x).$

=== Symmetric Positive Definite Formulation ===
It is convenient to introduce the symmetric positive definite (SPD) operator

$A_c := -\,c\,\Delta(c\,\cdot),$

and the rescaled wave field

$P^s(t,x) := \frac{c(x_s)}{c(x)}\,p^s_c(t,x) = -\,\frac{c(x_s)}{c(x)}\,f'(-\!\cdot)\,\star_t\,p^s(\cdot,x),$

which satisfies the SPD PDE

$[\,\partial_t^2 + A_c\,]\,P^s(t,x) = F'(t)\,\delta_{x_s}(x).$

Define the even-in-time wave

$W(t,x):=P^s(t,x)+P^s(-t,x),$

which obeys the homogeneous equation

$[\,\partial_t^2 + A_c\,]\,W(t,x)=0,$

with the initial state

$W(0,x)=\varphi(x):=\widehat{F}[\sqrt{A_c}]\,\delta_{x_s}(x).$

This wave can be expressed explicitly as

$W(t,x)=\cos[t\,\sqrt{A_c}]\,\varphi(x).$

=== Reference Medium and Green’s Function ===
Let $c_0(x)$ denote a reference (background) velocity field, with operator $A_{c_0}:=-,c_0,\Delta(c_0,\cdot)$. The corresponding causal Green’s function $G_0(t,x,x')$ satisfies

$[\partial_t^2 + A_{c_0}]\,G_0(t,x,x') = \delta'(t)\,\delta_{x'}(x), \qquad G_0(t,x,x')=0\ \text{for}\ t<0.$

Boundary conditions are chosen consistently (Dirichlet–Neumann mixed type):

$\big[\,1_{\partial\Omega_D}(x) +1_{\partial\Omega_N}(x)\,\partial_n\big]\,G_0(t,x,x')=0.$

=== Derivation of the Lippmann–Schwinger Equation ===
Since $[\partial_t^2 + A_c],W=0$ and $[\partial_t^2 + A_{c_0}]G_0=\delta'(t)\delta_{x'}(x)$, then

$W(t,x) = W_0(t,x) - \int_0^t\!\!\int_{\Omega} G_0(t-t',x,x')\,V(x')\,\partial_{t'}W(t',x')\, dx'\,dt',$

where $W_0$ denotes the corresponding solution in the reference medium, i.e. $[\partial_t^2 + A_{c_0}]W_0=0$ with the corresponding initial data.

For imaging, the contrast $V(x') = -\,\frac{c^2(x')-c_0^2(x')}{c(x')\,c_0(x')}$ is the quantity of interest.

This space–time integral equation expresses the total (scattered + background) field $W$ in terms of the background field $W_0$ and the medium contrast $(c^2 - c_0^2)/(c,c_0)$. Linearizing this equation by substituting $W \approx W_0$ inside the integral yields the Born approximation, commonly used in acoustic and seismic scattering theory.

== See also ==
- Bethe–Salpeter equation

== Bibliography ==
- Joachain, C. J. (1983). Quantum collision theory. North Holland. ISBN 978-0-7204-0294-0.
- Sakurai, J. J. (1994). Modern Quantum Mechanics. Addison Wesley. ISBN 978-0-201-53929-5.
- Weinberg, S. (2002) [1995]. Foundations. The Quantum Theory of Fields. Vol. 1. Cambridge: Cambridge University Press. ISBN 978-0-521-55001-7.

=== Original publications ===
- Lippmann, B. A.; Schwinger, J. (1950). "Variational Principles for Scattering Processes. I". Phys. Rev. Lett. 79 (3): 469–480. Bibcode:1950PhRv...79..469L. doi:10.1103/PhysRev.79.469.
- Wheeler, J. A. (1937). "On the Mathematical Description of Light Nuclei by the Method of Resonating Group Structure". Phys. Rev. 52 (11): 1107–1122. Bibcode:1937PhRv...52.1107W. doi:10.1103/PhysRev.52.1107.
