= Born series =

The Born series is the expansion of different scattering quantities in quantum scattering theory in the powers of the interaction potential $V$ (more precisely in powers of $G_0 V,$ where $G_0$ is the free particle Green's operator). It is closely related to Born approximation, which is the first order term of the Born series. The series can formally be understood as power series introducing the coupling constant by substitution $V \to \lambda V$. The speed of convergence and radius of convergence of the Born series are related to eigenvalues of the operator $G_0 V$. In general the first few terms of the Born series are good approximation to the expanded quantity for "weak" interaction $V$ and large collision energy.

== Born series for scattering states ==
The Born series for the scattering states reads

$$|\psi\rangle = |\phi \rangle + G_0(E) V |\phi\rangle + [G_0(E) V]^2 |\phi\rangle + [G_0(E) V]^3 |\phi\rangle + \dots$$

It can be derived by iterating the Lippmann–Schwinger equation

$$|\psi\rangle = |\phi \rangle + G_0(E) V |\psi\rangle.$$

Note that the Green's operator $G_0$ for a free particle can be retarded/advanced or standing wave operator for retarded $|\psi^{(+)}\rangle$ advanced $|\psi^{(-)}\rangle$ or standing wave scattering states $|\psi^{(P)}\rangle$. The first iteration is obtained by replacing the full scattering solution $|\psi\rangle$ with free particle wave function $|\phi\rangle$ on the right hand side of the Lippmann-Schwinger equation and it gives the first Born approximation. The second iteration substitutes the first Born approximation in the right hand side and the result is called the second Born approximation. In general the n-th Born approximation takes n-terms of the series into account. The second Born approximation is sometimes used, when the first Born approximation vanishes, but the higher terms are rarely used. The Born series can formally be summed as geometric series with the common ratio equal to the operator $G_0 V$, giving the formal solution to Lippmann-Schwinger equation in the form

$$|\psi\rangle = [I - G_0(E) V]^{-1} |\phi \rangle = [V - VG_0(E) V]^{-1} V |\phi \rangle .$$

== Born series for T-matrix ==
The Born series can also be written for other scattering quantities like the T-matrix which is closely related to the scattering amplitude. Iterating Lippmann-Schwinger equation for the T-matrix we get

$$T(E) = V + V G_0(E) V + V [G_0(E) V]^2  + V [G_0(E) V]^3  + \dots$$

For the T-matrix $G_0$ stands only for retarded Green's operator $G_0^{(+)}(E)$. The standing wave Green's operator would give the K-matrix instead.

== Born series for full Green's operator ==
The Lippmann-Schwinger equation for Green's operator is called the resolvent identity,

$$G(E) = G_0(E) + G_0(E) V G(E).$$

Its solution by iteration leads to the Born series for the full Green's operator $G(E)=(E-H+i\epsilon)^{-1}$

$$G(E) = G_0(E) + G_0(E) V G_0(E) + [G_0(E) V]^2 G_0(E) + [G_0(E) V]^3 G_0(E) + \dots$$

== Bibliography ==
- Joachain, Charles J. (1983). Quantum collision theory. North Holland. ISBN 978-0-7204-0294-0.
- Taylor, John R. (1972). Scattering Theory: The Quantum Theory on Nonrelativistic Collisions. John Wiley. ISBN 978-0-471-84900-1.
- Newton, Roger G. (2002). Scattering Theory of Waves and Particles. Dover Publications, inc. ISBN 978-0-486-42535-1.
