= Ionization =

Process by which atoms or molecules acquire charge by gaining or losing electrons

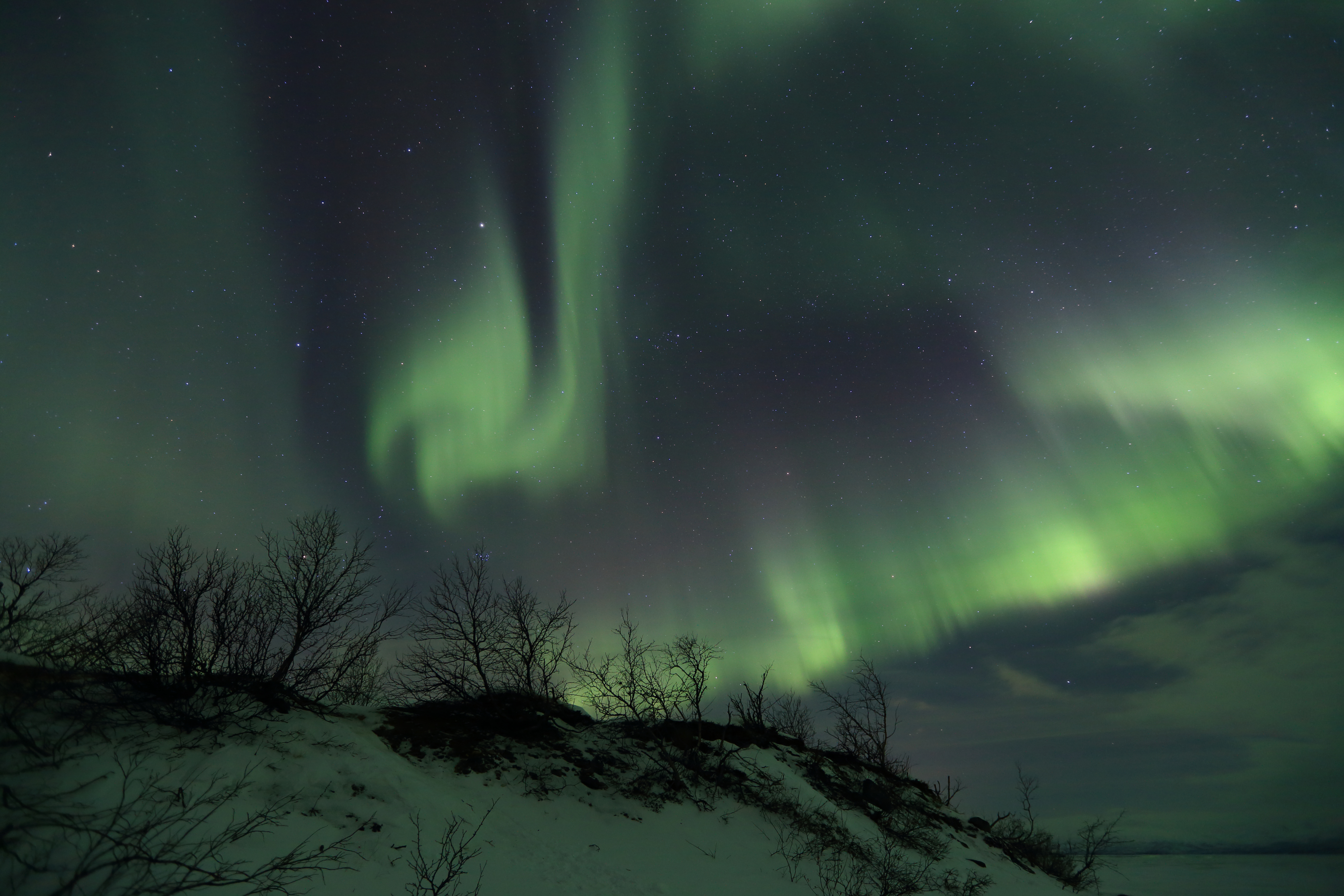
The solar wind moving through the magnetosphere alters the movements of charged particles in the Earth's thermosphere or exosphere, and the resulting ionization of these particles causes them to emit light of varying color, thus forming auroras near the polar regions.

Ionization or ionisation is the process by which an atom or a molecule acquires a negative or positive charge by gaining or losing electrons, often in conjunction with other chemical changes. The resulting electrically charged atom or molecule is called an ion. Ionization can result from the loss of an electron after collisions with subatomic particles, collisions with other atoms, molecules, electrons, positrons, protons, antiprotons, and ions, or through the interaction with electromagnetic radiation. Heterolytic bond cleavage and heterolytic substitution reactions can result in the formation of ion pairs. Ionization can occur through radioactive decay by the internal conversion process, in which an excited nucleus transfers its energy to one of the inner-shell electrons causing it to be ejected.

== Uses ==
Everyday examples of gas ionization occur within a fluorescent lamp or other electrical discharge lamps. It is also used in radiation detectors such as the Geiger-Müller counter or the ionization chamber. The ionization process is widely used in a variety of equipment in fundamental science (e.g., mass spectrometry) and in medical treatment (e.g., radiation therapy). It is also widely used for air purification, though studies have shown harmful effects of this application.

== Production of ions ==
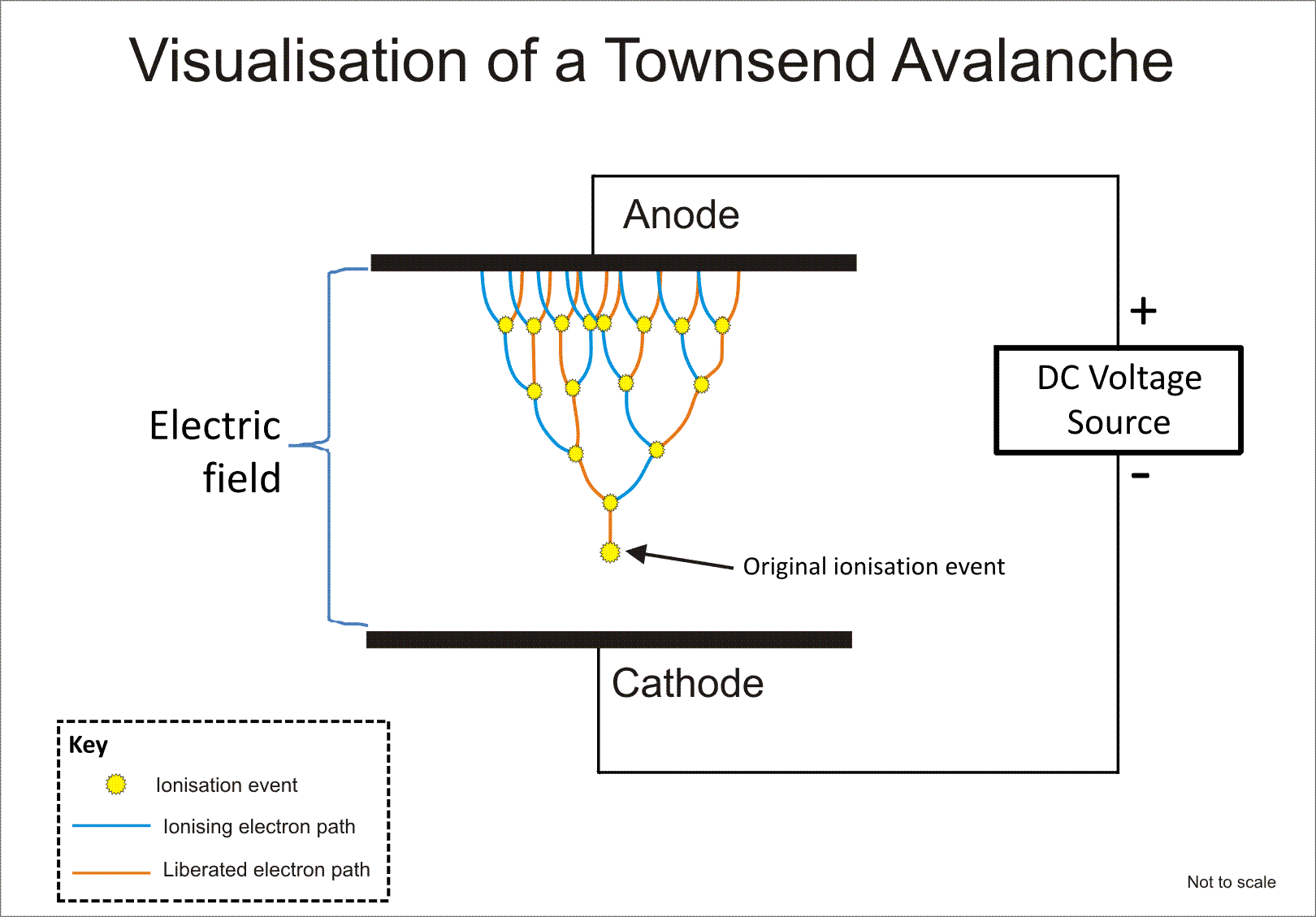
Avalanche effect in an electric field created between two electrodes. The original ionization event liberates one electron, and each subsequent collision liberates a further electron, so two electrons emerge from each collision: the ionizing electron and the liberated electron.

Negatively charged ions are produced when a free electron collides with an atom and is subsequently trapped inside the electric potential barrier, releasing any excess energy. The process is known as electron capture ionization.

Positively charged ions are produced by transferring an amount of energy to a bound electron in a collision with charged particles (e.g. ions, electrons or positrons) or with photons. The threshold amount of the required energy is known as ionization energy. The study of such collisions is of fundamental importance with regard to the few-body problem, which is one of the major unsolved problems in physics. Kinematically complete experiments, i.e. experiments in which the complete momentum vector of all collision fragments (the scattered projectile, the recoiling target-ion, and the ejected electron) are determined, have contributed to major advances in the theoretical understanding of the few-body problem in recent years.

=== Adiabatic ionization ===
Adiabatic ionization is a form of ionization in which an electron is removed from or added to an atom or molecule in its lowest energy state to form an ion in its lowest energy state.

The Townsend discharge is a good example of the creation of positive ions and free electrons due to ion impact. It is a cascade reaction involving electrons in a region with a sufficiently high electric field in a gaseous medium that can be ionized, such as air. Following an original ionization event, due to such as ionizing radiation, the positive ion drifts towards the cathode, while the free electron drifts towards the anode of the device. If the electric field is strong enough, the free electron gains sufficient energy to liberate a further electron when it next collides with another molecule. The two free electrons then travel towards the anode and gain sufficient energy from the electric field to cause impact ionization when the next collisions occur; and so on. This is effectively a chain reaction of electron generation, and is dependent on the free electrons gaining sufficient energy between collisions to sustain the avalanche.

Ionization efficiency is the ratio of the number of ions formed to the number of electrons or photons used.

== Ionization energy of atoms ==
Ionization energies of neutral elements (predicted beyond 104)

The trend in the ionization energy of atoms is often used to demonstrate the periodic behavior of atoms with respect to the atomic number, as summarized by ordering atoms in Mendeleev's table. This is a valuable tool for establishing and understanding the ordering of electrons in atomic orbitals without going into the details of wave functions or the ionization process.

An example is presented in the figure to the right. The periodic abrupt decrease in ionization potential after noble gas elements indicates the emergence of a new shell in alkali metals. In addition, the local maximums in the ionization energy plot, moving from left to right in a row, are indicative of s, p, d, and f sub-shells.

== Physical descriptions of ionization ==
=== Semi-classical description of ionization ===
Classical physics and the Bohr model of the atom can qualitatively explain photoionization and collision-mediated ionization. In these cases, during the ionization process, the energy of the electron exceeds the energy difference of the potential barrier it is trying to pass. The classical description, however, cannot describe tunnel ionization since the process involves the passage of electron through a classically forbidden potential barrier.

=== Quantum mechanical description of ionization ===
The interaction of atoms and molecules with sufficiently strong laser pulses or with other charged particles leads to the ionization to singly or multiply charged ions. The ionization rate, i.e. the ionization probability in unit time, can be calculated using quantum mechanics. (There are classical methods available also, like the Classical Trajectory Monte Carlo Method (CTMC), but it is not overall accepted and often criticized by the community.). Two quantum mechanical methods exist: perturbative and non-perturbative. Methods like time-dependent coupled-channel or time independent close coupling – where the wave function is expanded in a finite basis set – are examples of non-perturbative methods and numerous options exist e.g. B-splines, generalized Sturmians or Coulomb wave packets. Another non-perturbative method is to solve the corresponding Schrödinger equation fully numerically on a lattice.

In general, analytic solutions are not available, and the approximations required for manageable numerical calculations do not provide acceptably accurate results. However, when the laser intensity is sufficiently high, the detailed structure of the atom or molecule can be ignored and an analytic solution for the ionization rate is possible.

==== Tunnel ionization ====
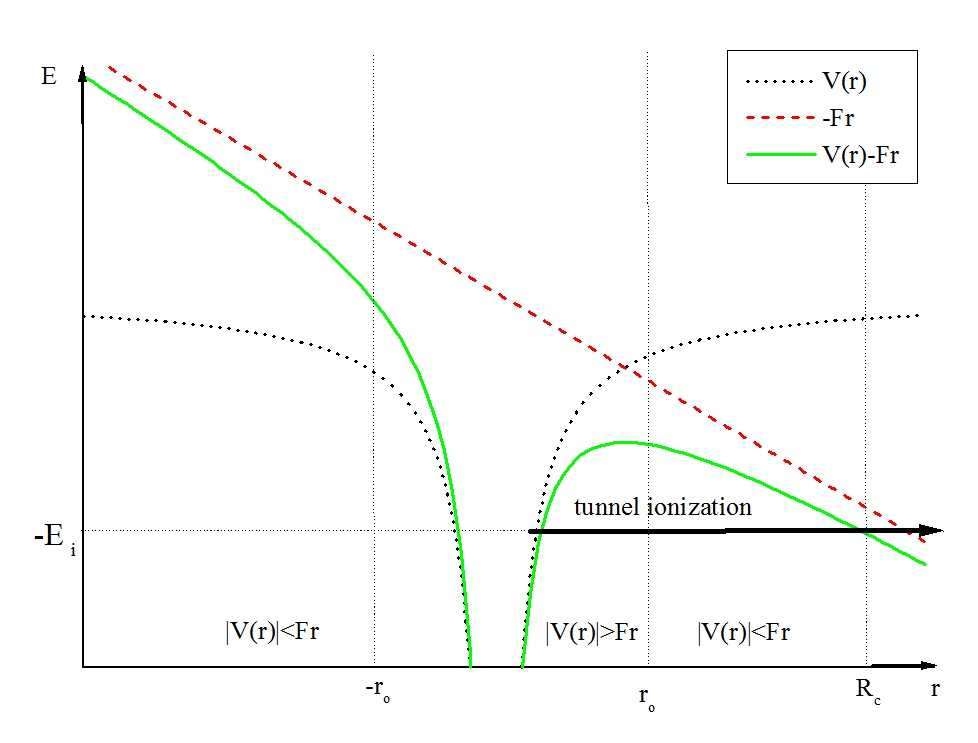
Combined potential of an atom and a uniform laser field. At distances r < r_{0}, the potential of the laser can be neglected, while at distances with r > r_{0} the Coulomb potential is negligible compared to the potential of the laser field. The electron emerges from under the barrier at r = R_{c}. E_{i} is the ionization potential of the atom.

Tunnel ionization is ionization due to quantum tunneling. In classical ionization, an electron must have enough energy to make it over the potential barrier, but quantum tunneling allows the electron simply to go through the potential barrier instead of going all the way over it because of the wave nature of the electron. The probability of an electron's tunneling through the barrier drops off exponentially with the width of the potential barrier. Therefore, an electron with a higher energy can make it further up the potential barrier, leaving a much thinner barrier to tunnel through and thus a greater chance to do so. In practice, tunnel ionization is observable when the atom or molecule is interacting with near-infrared strong laser pulses. This process can be understood as a process by which a bounded electron, through the absorption of more than one photon from the laser field, is ionized. This picture is generally known as multiphoton ionization (MPI).

Keldysh modeled the MPI process as a transition of the electron from the ground state of the atom to the Volkov states. In this model the perturbation of the ground state by the laser field is neglected and the details of atomic structure in determining the ionization probability are not taken into account. The major difficulty with Keldysh's model was its neglect of the effects of Coulomb interaction on the final state of the electron. As it is observed from figure, the Coulomb field is not very small in magnitude compared to the potential of the laser at larger distances from the nucleus. This is in contrast to the approximation made by neglecting the potential of the laser at regions near the nucleus. Perelomov et al. included the Coulomb interaction at larger internuclear distances. Their model (which we call the PPT model) was derived for short range potential and includes the effect of the long range Coulomb interaction through the first order correction in the quasi-classical action. Larochelle et al. have compared the theoretically predicted ion versus intensity curves of rare gas atoms interacting with a Ti:Sapphire laser with experimental measurement. They have shown that the total ionization rate predicted by the PPT model fit very well the experimental ion yields for all rare gases in the intermediate regime of the Keldysh parameter.

The rate of MPI on atom with an ionization potential $E_i$ in a linearly polarized laser with frequency $\omega$ is given by:

$$W_{PPT} =
\left|C_{n^* l^*}\right|^2 \sqrt{\frac{6}{\pi}} f_{lm}
E_i \left(\frac{2}{F} \left(2E_i\right)^{\frac{3}{2}}\right)^{2n^* - |m|- \frac{3}{2}}
\left(1 + \gamma^2\right)^{\left|\frac{m}{2}\right|+ \frac{3}{4}}
A_m (\omega, \gamma) e^{-\frac{2}{F}\left(2E_i\right)^{\frac{3}{2}} g\left(\gamma\right)}$$

where

- $\gamma=\frac{\omega \sqrt{2E_i}}{F}$ is the Keldysh parameter,
- $n^*=\frac{\sqrt{2E_i}}{Z^2}$,
- $F$ is the peak electric field of the laser and
- $l^*=n^* - 1$.

The coefficients $f_{lm}$, $g(\gamma)$ and $C_{n^* l^*}$ are given by

$$\begin{align}
f_{lm} &= \frac{(2l + 1)(l + |m|)!}{2^m |m|!(l - |m|)!} \\
g(\gamma) &= \frac{3}{2\gamma} \left[\left(1 + \frac{1}{2\gamma^2} \right)\sinh^{-1}(\gamma) - \frac{\sqrt{1 + \gamma^2}}{2\gamma}\right] \\
|C_{n^* l^*}|^2 &= \frac{2^{2n^*}}{n^* \Gamma(n^* + l^* + 1) \Gamma(n^* - l^*)}
\end{align}$$

The coefficient $A_m (\omega, \gamma)$ is given by

$$A_m (\omega, \gamma) =
\frac{4}{3\pi} \frac{1}{|m|!}
\frac{\gamma^2}{1 + \gamma^2}
\sum_{n>v}^\infty e^{-(n - v) \alpha(\gamma)}
w_m \left(\sqrt{\frac{2\gamma}{\sqrt{1 + \gamma^2}} (n - v)}\right)$$

where

$$\begin{align}
w_m(x) &= e^{-x^2} \int_0^x (x^2 - y^2)^m e^{y^2}\,dy \\
\alpha(\gamma) &= 2\left(\sinh^{-1}(\gamma) - \frac{\gamma}{\sqrt{1 + \gamma^2}}\right) \\
v &= \frac{E_i}{\omega} \left(1 + \frac{1}{2\gamma^2}\right)
\end{align}$$

==== Quasi-static tunnel ionization ====
The quasi-static tunneling (QST) is the ionization whose rate can be satisfactorily predicted by the ADK model, i.e. the limit of the PPT model when $\gamma$ approaches zero. The rate of QST is given by

$$W_{ADK} =
\left|C_{n^* l^*}\right|^2 \sqrt{\frac{6}{\pi}}
f_{lm} E_i \left(\frac{2}{F} \left(2E_i\right)^{\frac{3}{2}}\right)^{2n^* - |m|- \frac{3}{2}}
e^{-\frac{2}{3F} \left(2E_i\right)^{\frac{3}{2}}}$$

As compared to $W_{PPT}$ the absence of summation over n, which represent different above threshold ionization (ATI) peaks, is remarkable.

== Strong field approximation for the ionization rate ==
The calculations of PPT are done in the E-gauge, meaning that the laser field is taken as electromagnetic waves. The ionization rate can also be calculated in A-gauge, which emphasizes the particle nature of light (absorbing multiple photons during ionization). This approach was adopted by Krainov model based on the earlier works of Faisal and Reiss. The resulting rate is given by

$$W_{KRA} =
\sum_{n=N}^{\infty} 2 \pi \omega^2 p \left(n - n_\mathrm{osc}\right)^2 \int \mathrm{d}\Omega
\left|FT \left(I_{KAR} \Psi \left(\mathbf{r}\right)\right)\right|^2
J_n^2 \left(n_f, \frac{n_\mathrm{osc}}{2}\right)$$

where:

- $n_{i} =E_i/\omega,$
- $n_\mathrm{osc}=U_{p}/ \omega$ with $U_p$ being the ponderomotive energy,
- $N=[n_i + n_\mathrm{osc}]$ is the minimum number of photons necessary to ionize the atom,
- $J_{n}(u,v)$ is the double Bessel function,
- $p=\sqrt{ 2 \omega (n-n_\mathrm{osc}- n_i)},$
- $n_{f}=2 \sqrt { n_\mathrm{osc} / \omega} p \cos(\theta)$ with $\theta$ the angle between the momentum of the electron, p, and the electric field of the laser, F,
- FT is the three-dimensional Fourier transform, and
- $I_{KAR}=\left(\frac {2 Z^2}{n^2 F r}\right)^n$ incorporates the Coulomb correction in the SFA model.

=== Population trapping ===
In calculating the rate of MPI of atoms only transitions to the continuum states are considered. Such an approximation is acceptable as long as there is no multiphoton resonance between the ground state and some excited states. However, in real situation of interaction with pulsed lasers, during the evolution of laser intensity, due to different Stark shift of the ground and excited states there is a possibility that some excited state go into multiphoton resonance with the ground state. Within the dressed atom picture, the ground state dressed by $m$ photons and the resonant state undergo an avoided crossing at the resonance intensity $I_r$. The minimum distance, $V_m$, at the avoided crossing is proportional to the generalized Rabi frequency, $\Gamma(t) =\Gamma_m I(t)^{m/2}$ coupling the two states. According to Story et al., the probability of remaining in the ground state, $P_g$, is given by

$$P_g = \exp\left(-\frac{2\pi W_m^2}{\mathrm{d}W/\mathrm{d}t}\right)$$

where $W$ is the time-dependent energy difference between the two dressed states. In interaction with a short pulse, if the dynamic resonance is reached in the rising or the falling part of the pulse, the population practically remains in the ground state and the effect of multiphoton resonances may be neglected. However, if the states go onto resonance at the peak of the pulse, where $\mathrm{d}W/\mathrm{d}t = 0$, then the excited state is populated. After being populated, since the ionization potential of the excited state is small, it is expected that the electron will be instantly ionized.

In 1992, de Boer and Muller showed that Xe atoms subjected to short laser pulses could survive in the highly excited states 4f, 5f, and 6f. These states were believed to have been excited by the dynamic Stark shift of the levels into multiphoton resonance with the field during the rising part of the laser pulse. Subsequent evolution of the laser pulse did not completely ionize these states, leaving behind some highly excited atoms. We shall refer to this phenomenon as "population trapping".

Schematic presentation of lambda type population trapping. G is the ground state of the atom. 1 and 2 are two degenerate excited states. After the population is transferred to the states due to multiphoton resonance, these states are coupled through continuum c and the population is trapped in the superposition of these states.

We mention the theoretical calculation that incomplete ionization occurs whenever there is parallel resonant excitation into a common level with ionization loss. We consider a state such as 6f of Xe which consists of 7 quasi-degnerate levels in the range of the laser bandwidth. These levels along with the continuum constitute a lambda system. The mechanism of the lambda type trapping is schematically presented in figure. At the rising part of the pulse (a) the excited state (with two degenerate levels 1 and 2) are not in multiphoton resonance with the ground state. The electron is ionized through multiphoton coupling with the continuum.

As the intensity of the pulse is increased the excited state and the continuum are shifted in energy due to the Stark shift. At the peak of the pulse (b) the excited states go into multiphoton resonance with the ground state. As the intensity starts to decrease (c), the two state are coupled through continuum and the population is trapped in a coherent superposition of the two states. Under subsequent action of the same pulse, due to interference in the transition amplitudes of the lambda system, the field cannot ionize the population completely and a fraction of the population will be trapped in a coherent superposition of the quasi degenerate levels. According to this explanation, the states with higher angular momentum – with more sublevels – would have a higher probability of trapping the population. In general the strength of the trapping will be determined by the strength of the two photon coupling between the quasi-degenerate levels via the continuum. In 1996, using a very stable laser and by minimizing the masking effects of the focal region expansion with increasing intensity, Talebpour et al. observed structures on the curves of singly charged ions of Xe, Kr and Ar. These structures were attributed to electron trapping in the strong laser field. A more unambiguous demonstration of population trapping has been reported by T. Morishita and C. D. Lin.

=== Non-sequential multiple ionization ===
The phenomenon of non-sequential ionization (NSI) of atoms exposed to intense laser fields has been a subject of many theoretical and experimental studies since 1983. The pioneering work began with the observation of a "knee" structure on the Xe^{2+} ion signal versus intensity curve by L'Huillier et al. From the experimental point of view, the NS double ionization refers to processes which somehow enhance the rate of production of doubly charged ions by a huge factor at intensities below the saturation intensity of the singly charged ion. Many, on the other hand, prefer to define the NSI as a process by which two electrons are ionized nearly simultaneously. This definition implies that apart from the sequential channel $A+L -> A^+ + L -> A^{++}$ there is another channel $A+L-> A^{++}$ which is the main contribution to the production of doubly charged ions at lower intensities. The first observation of triple NSI in argon interacting with a 1 μm laser was reported by Augst et al. Later, systematically studying the NSI of all rare gas atoms, the quadruple NSI of Xe was observed. The most important conclusion of this study was the observation of the following relation between the rate of NSI to any charge state and the rate of tunnel ionization (predicted by the ADK formula) to the previous charge states;

$$W_{NS}(A^{n+})= \sum_{i=1}^{n-1} \alpha_n\left(\lambda\right) W_{ADK}\left(A^{i+}\right)$$

where $W_{ADK}\left(A^{i+}\right)$ is the rate of quasi-static tunneling to i'th charge state and $\alpha_n(\lambda)$ are some constants depending on the wavelength of the laser (but not on the pulse duration).

Two models have been proposed to explain the non-sequential ionization; the shake-off model and electron re-scattering model. The shake-off (SO) model, first proposed by Fittinghoff et al., is adopted from the field of ionization of atoms by X rays and electron projectiles where the SO process is one of the major mechanisms responsible for the multiple ionization of atoms. The SO model describes the NSI process as a mechanism where one electron is ionized by the laser field and the departure of this electron is so rapid that the remaining electrons do not have enough time to adjust themselves to the new energy states. Therefore, there is a certain probability that, after the ionization of the first electron, a second electron is excited to states with higher energy (shake-up) or even ionized (shake-off). We should mention that, until now, there has been no quantitative calculation based on the SO model, and the model is still qualitative.

The electron rescattering model was independently developed by Kuchiev, Schafer et al, Corkum, Becker and Faisal and Faisal and Becker. The principal features of the model can be understood easily from Corkum's version. Corkum's model describes the NS ionization as a process whereby an electron is tunnel ionized. The electron then interacts with the laser field where it is accelerated away from the nuclear core. If the electron has been ionized at an appropriate phase of the field, it will pass by the position of the remaining ion half a cycle later, where it can free an additional electron by electron impact. Only half of the time the electron is released with the appropriate phase and the other half it never return to the nuclear core. The maximum kinetic energy that the returning electron can have is 3.17 times the ponderomotive potential ($U_p$) of the laser. Corkum's model places a cut-off limit on the minimum intensity ($U_p$ is proportional to intensity) where ionization due to re-scattering can occur.

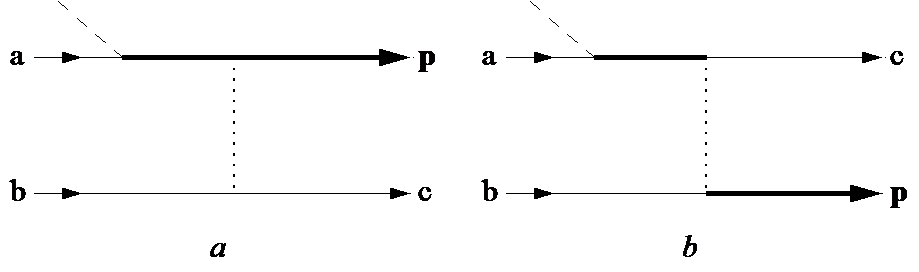
Feynman diagram for the process of double ionization in an atom through re-scattering mechanism

The re-scattering model in Kuchiev's version (Kuchiev's model) is quantum mechanical. The basic idea of the model is illustrated by Feynman diagrams in figure a. First both electrons are in the ground state of an atom. The lines marked a and b describe the corresponding atomic states. Then the electron a is ionized. The beginning of the ionization process is shown by the intersection with a sloped dashed line. where the MPI occurs. The propagation of the ionized electron in the laser field, during which it absorbs other photons (ATI), is shown by the full thick line. The collision of this electron with the parent atomic ion is shown by a vertical dotted line representing the Coulomb interaction between the electrons. The state marked with c describes the ion excitation to a discrete or continuum state. Figure b describes the exchange process. Kuchiev's model, contrary to Corkum's model, does not predict any threshold intensity for the occurrence of NS ionization.

Kuchiev did not include the Coulomb effects on the dynamics of the ionized electron. This resulted in the underestimation of the double ionization rate by a huge factor. Obviously, in the approach of Becker and Faisal (which is equivalent to Kuchiev's model in spirit), this drawback does not exist. In fact, their model is more exact and does not suffer from the large number of approximations made by Kuchiev. Their calculation results perfectly fit with the experimental results of Walker et al. Becker and Faisal have been able to fit the experimental results on the multiple NSI of rare gas atoms using their model. As a result, the electron re-scattering can be taken as the main mechanism for the occurrence of the NSI process

== Kramers–Henneberger frame ==
The Kramers–Henneberger(KF) frame is the non-inertial frame moving with the free electron under the influence of the harmonic laser pulse, obtained by applying a translation to the laboratory frame equal to the quiver motion of a classical electron in the laboratory frame. In other words, in the Kramers–Henneberger frame the classical electron is at rest. Starting in the lab frame (velocity gauge), we may describe the electron with the Hamiltonian:

$$H_{lab}=\frac{1}{2}(\mathbf{P}+\frac{1}{c}\mathbf{A}(t))^2 + V(r)$$

In the dipole approximation, the quiver motion of a classical electron in the laboratory frame for an arbitrary field can be obtained from the vector potential of the electromagnetic field:

$$\mathbf{\alpha}(t) \equiv \frac{1}{c} \int^{t}_{0}\mathbf{A}(t')dt' =  (\alpha_0/E_0)\mathbf{E}(t)$$

where $\alpha_0 \equiv E_0\omega^{-2}$ for a monochromatic plane wave.

By applying a transformation to the laboratory frame equal to the quiver motion $\mathbf{\alpha}(t)$ one moves to the 'oscillating' or 'Kramers–Henneberger' frame, in which the classical electron is at rest. By a phase factor transformation for convenience one obtains the 'space-translated' Hamiltonian, which is unitarily equivalent to the lab-frame Hamiltonian, which contains the original potential centered on the oscillating point $-\mathbf{\alpha}(t)$:

$$H_{KH}=\frac{1}{2}\mathbf{P}^2 + V(\mathbf{r} + \mathbf{\alpha}(t))$$

The utility of the KH frame lies in the fact that in this frame the laser-atom interaction can be reduced to the form of an oscillating potential energy, where the natural parameters describing the electron dynamics are $\omega$ and $\alpha_0$(sometimes called the "excursion amplitude', obtained from $\mathbf{\alpha}(t)$).

From here one can apply Floquet theory to calculate quasi-stationary solutions of the TDSE. In high frequency Floquet theory, to lowest order in $\omega^{-1}$ the system reduces to the so-called 'structure equation', which has the form of a typical energy-eigenvalue Schrödinger equation containing the 'dressed potential' $V_0(\alpha_0,\mathbf{r})$ (the cycle-average of the oscillating potential). The interpretation of the presence of $V_0$ is as follows: in the oscillating frame, the nucleus has an oscillatory motion of trajectory $-\mathbf{\alpha}(t)$ and $V_0$ can be seen as the potential of the smeared out nuclear charge along its trajectory.

The KH frame is thus employed in theoretical studies of strong-field ionization and atomic stabilization (a predicted phenomenon in which the ionization probability of an atom in a high-intensity, high-frequency field actually decreases for intensities above a certain threshold) in conjunction with high-frequency Floquet theory.

The KF frame was successfully applied for different problems as well e.g. for higher-hamonic generation from a metal surface in a powerful laser field

== Distinction between Ionization and Dissociation ==
A substance may dissociate without necessarily producing ions. As an example, the molecules of table sugar dissociate in water (sugar is dissolved) but exist as intact neutral entities. Another subtle event is the dissociation of sodium chloride (table salt) into sodium and chlorine ions. Although it may seem as a case of ionization, in reality, the ions already exist within the crystal lattice. When salt is dissociated, its constituent ions are simply surrounded by water molecules and their effects are visible (e.g. the solution becomes electrolytic). However, no transfer or displacement of electrons occurs.

== Table ==
Phase transitions of matter
To From	Solid	Liquid	Gas	Plasma
Solid		Melting	Sublimation	ablation
Liquid	Freezing		Vaporization	
Gas	Deposition	Condensation		Ionization
Plasma			Recombination	

== See also ==
- Above threshold ionization
- Double ionization
- Chemical ionization
- Electron ionization
- Ionization chamber – Instrument for detecting gaseous ionization, used in ionizing radiation measurements
- Ion source
- Photoionization
- Thermal ionization
- Townsend avalanche – The chain reaction of ionization occurring in a gas with an applied electric field
- Poole–Frenkel effect
