= Cutkosky =

Cutkosky is a surname. Notable people with the surname include:

- Ethan Cutkosky (born 1999), American actor and singer
- Richard E. Cutkosky (1928–1993), American physicist
