= Bernard Lippmann =

US-American physicist

- Born: Bernard Abram Lippmann; August 18, 1914; New York City, New York, USA
- Died: February 12, 1988 (aged 73); Palo Alto, California, USA
- Education: New York University Polytechnic School of Engineering (BS); University of Michigan (MS); Harvard University (PhD)
- Known for: Lippmann-Schwinger equation
- Scientific career
- Fields: Physics
- Workplaces: Radiation Laboratory (MIT); United States Naval Research Laboratory; Lawrence Berkeley National Laboratory; New York University; Goddard Institute for Space Studies
- Doctoral advisor: Julian Schwinger

Bernard Abram Lippmann. (August 18, 1914 – February 12, 1988) was an American theoretical physicist. A former professor of physics at New York University, Lippmann is mainly known for the Lippmann-Schwinger equation, a widely used tool in non-relativistic scattering theory, which he formulated together with his doctoral supervisor Julian Schwinger

== Biography ==
Bernard Lippmann was born in Brooklyn, New York City, in 1914. After initially attending the Polytechnic School of Brooklyn, where he attained a bachelor's degree in electrical engineering, he switched to physics and was admitted to the degree of Master of Science at the University of Michigan in 1935

Subsequently, Lippmann entered the industry, where he held various engineering roles until the entry of the United States into the Second World War when he joined MIT's Radiation Laboratory. From 1941 until the end of the war, he conducted experimental and theoretical research on the X band and K band regions of the microwave region of the electromagnetic spectrum, specifically in their generation by circuitry, as well as similar work on directional couplers and microwave junctions. After the war, in 1946, he began his Doctor of Philosophy degree at Harvard under the supervision of Schwinger, while also leading the radar receiver group at the Submarine Signal Company in Boston (later amalgamated into Raytheon).

For his doctoral thesis, Lippmann collaborated with Schwinger to produce the Lippmann-Schwinger equation, an integral equation formulation of the Schrödinger equation intended to calculate scattering cross-sections since the required boundary conditions are implicit in the formalism. The equation is the basis for the majority of calculations pertaining to non-relativistic scattering processes, finding application in atomic, molecular, and optical physics, as well as low-energy nuclear physics and particle physics.

After being awarded his doctorate in 1948, Lippmann spent the subsequent two decades conducting research at several American institutions. Initially, these investigations were focused on particle trajectories, magnetohydrodynamics, scattering processes, and solid-state physics at the Naval Research Laboratory, New York University's Institute of Mathematical Sciences, and his alma mater, the Polytechnic Institute of Brooklyn. Furthermore, from 1957 to 1962, he was a researcher at the Lawrence Radiation Laboratory, where he studied both classical and quantum mechanical scattering, followed by a period as the director of research at the General Research Corporation, Santa Barbara, California. Later, in 1968 – 1969, he was a senior research associate at NASA's Goddard Institute for Space Studies. Much of his research during this time is classified, and so the papers attributed to him that are publicly available are only a small portion of the entire catalogue of his papers. Subsequently, Lippmann returned to academia when he was appointed as a professor of physics at NYU in 1969 until his retirement in 1977.

Following his retirement, Lippmann relocated to California, where he served as the manager of the theoretical physics department at the Physics International Company in San Leandro, California, a manufacturer of intense cathode ray generators, as well as a consultant for the Stanford Linear Accelerator. Lippmann died in Palo Alto, California, in 1988, aged 73.
