= Franz Gross =

American theoretical physicist

Franz Lucretius Gross (born August 9, 1937, in Minneapolis) is an American theoretical physicist.

== Education and career ==
Gross studied at Swarthmore College (Bachelor's degree in 1958) and received his doctorate from Princeton University in 1963. He then went to Cornell University, where he became assistant professor in 1966 and associate professor in 1969. In 1970 he became Associate Professor and in 1976 Professor at the College of William and Mary. From 1996 to 2000 he was Dean of Research (and Graduate Studies) there and in 2002 he retired.

He has also worked at the particle accelerator CEBAF (later the Thomas Jefferson National Accelerator Facility, JLAB), from 1984 as associate director for Research, from 1986 as Senior Staff Theorist and from 2000 to 2002 as interim Head of the Theory Department and then as Principal Staff Scientist.

He has been a visiting scientist at the University of California, Santa Barbara (1969), the INFN (Istituto Nazionale di Fisica Nucleare) in Rome (1989), the University of Utrecht (1990), the Institute for Nuclear Theory (INT) at the University of Washington and a visiting professor at Carnegie-Mellon University (1981) and the Leibniz University of Hannover (1983). He is a Fellow of the American Physical Society and was a Fulbright and Woodrow Wilson Fellow.

== Research ==
Gross's work included the relativistic few-body problem in nuclear and particle physics (for example, quark models of mesons or nucleons in the deuteron or helium-3), the electromagnetic structure of hadrons and nuclei (elastic and inelastic electron scattering) and relativistic wave equations for bound states. He wrote a textbook on quantum field theory.

== Bibliography ==
- Franz, Gross (23 April 1999). Relativistic quantum mechanics and field theory. Wiley. doi:10.1002/9783527617333. ISBN 978-0-47135-386-7.
