= Optical theorem =

Theorem in physics

In physics, the optical theorem is a general law of wave scattering theory, which relates the zero-angle scattering amplitude to the total cross section of the scatterer. It is usually written in the form

$$\sigma=\frac{4\pi}{k}~\mathrm{Im}\,f(0),$$

where f(0) is the scattering amplitude with an angle of zero, that is the amplitude of the wave scattered to the center of a distant screen and k is the wave vector in the incident direction.

Because the optical theorem is derived using only conservation of energy, or in quantum mechanics from conservation of probability, the optical theorem is widely applicable and, in quantum mechanics, $\sigma_\mathrm{tot}$ includes both elastic and inelastic scattering.

The generalized optical theorem, first derived by Werner Heisenberg, follows from the unitary condition and is given by

$$f(\mathbf{n},\mathbf{n}') -f^*(\mathbf{n}',\mathbf{n})= \frac{ik}{2\pi} \int f(\mathbf{n},\mathbf{n}'')f^*(\mathbf{n}',\mathbf{n}'')\,d\Omega''$$

where $f(\mathbf{n},\mathbf{n}')$ is the scattering amplitude that depends on the direction $\mathbf{n}$ of the incident wave and the direction $\mathbf{n}'$of scattering and $d\Omega$ is the differential solid angle. When $\mathbf{n}=\mathbf{n}'$, the above relation yields the optical theorem since the left-hand side is just twice the imaginary part of $f(\mathbf{n},\mathbf{n})$ and since $\sigma=\int|f(\mathbf{n},\mathbf{n}'')|^2\,d\Omega''$. For scattering in a centrally symmetric field, $f$ depends only on the angle $\theta$ between $\mathbf{n}$ and $\mathbf{n}'$, in which case, the above relation reduces to

$$\mathrm{Im} f(\theta)=\frac{k}{4\pi}\int f(\gamma)f(\gamma')\,d\Omega''$$

where $\gamma$ and $\gamma'$ are the angles between $\mathbf{n}$ and $\mathbf{n}'$ and some direction $\mathbf{n}''$.

== History ==
The optical theorem was originally developed independently by Wolfgang Sellmeier and Lord Rayleigh in 1871. Lord Rayleigh recognized the zero-angle scattering amplitude in terms of the index of refraction as

$$n = 1 + 2\pi \frac{Nf(0)}{k^2}$$

(where N is the number density of scatterers), which he used in a study of the color and polarization of the sky.

The equation was later extended to quantum scattering theory by several individuals, and came to be known as the Bohr–Peierls–Placzek relation after a 1939 paper. It was first referred to as the "optical theorem" in print in 1955 by Hans Bethe and Frederic de Hoffmann, after it had been known as a "well known theorem of optics" for some time.

== Derivation ==
The theorem can be derived rather directly from a treatment of a scalar wave. If a plane wave is incident along positive z axis on an object, then the wave scattering amplitude a great distance away from the scatterer is approximately given by

$$\psi(\mathbf{r}) \approx e^{ikz}+f(\theta)\frac{e^{ikr}}{r}.$$

All higher terms, when squared, vanish more quickly than $1/r^2$, and so are negligible a great distance away. For large values of $z$ and for small angles, a Taylor expansion gives

$$r=\sqrt{x^2+y^2+z^2}\approx z+\frac{x^2+y^2}{2z}.$$

We would now like to use the fact that the intensity is proportional to the square of the amplitude $\psi$. Approximating $1/r$ as $1/z$, we have

$$\begin{align}
|\psi|^2 &\approx \left|e^{ikz}+\frac{f(\theta)}{z}e^{ikz}e^{ik(x^2+y^2)/2z}\right|^2 \\
&= 1+\frac{f(\theta)}{z}e^{ik(x^2+y^2)/2z}+\frac{f^*(\theta)}{z}e^{-ik(x^2+y^2)/2z}+\frac{|f(\theta)|^2}{z^2}.
\end{align}$$

If we drop the $1/z^2$ term and use the fact that $c+c^*=2\operatorname{Re}{c}$, we have

$$|\psi|^2 \approx 1+2\operatorname{Re}{\left[\frac{f(\theta)}{z}e^{ik(x^2+y^2)/2z}\right]}.$$

Now suppose we integrate over a screen far away in the xy plane, which is small enough for the small-angle approximations to be appropriate, but large enough that we can integrate the intensity over $-\infty$ to $\infty$ in x and y with negligible error. In optics, this is equivalent to summing over many fringes of the diffraction pattern. By the method of stationary phase, we can approximate $f(\theta)=f(0)$ in the below integral. We obtain

$$\int |\psi|^2\,dx\,dy \approx A +2\operatorname{Re}\left[\frac{f(0)}{z}\int_{-\infty}^{\infty} e^{ikx^2/2z}dx\int_{-\infty}^{\infty} e^{iky^2/2z}dy\right],$$

where A is the area of the surface integrated over. Although these are improper integrals, by suitable substitutions the exponentials can be transformed into complex Gaussians and the definite integrals evaluated resulting in:

$$\begin{align}
\int |\psi|^2\,da &= A + 2\operatorname{Re}\left[\frac{f(0)}{z}\,\frac{2\pi i z}{ k}\right] \\
&= A - \frac{4\pi}{k}\,\operatorname{Im}[f(0)].\end{align}$$

This is the probability of reaching the screen if none were scattered, lessened by an amount $(4\pi/k)\operatorname{Im}[f(0)]$, which is therefore the effective scattering cross section of the scatterer.

== See also ==
- S-matrix
- Kramers–Kronig relations § Hadronic scattering
- Unitarity (physics) § Scattering amplitude and the optical theorem
