= Wolfgang Sellmeier =

German theoretical physicist

Wolfgang Sellmeier was a German theoretical physicist who made major contributions to the understanding of the interactions between light and matter. In 1872 he published his seminal work Ueber die durch die Aetherschwingungen erregten Mitschwingungen der Körpertheilchen und deren Rückwirkung auf die ersteren, besonders zur Erklärung der Dispersion und ihrer Anomalien (On the resonances of atomic particles excited by ether vibrations and their effect on the former, particularly with regard to the explanation of dispersion and its anomalies).

The interaction of light with the particles that make up ordinary matter was not yet taken into account when explaining optical phenomena. In his 1872 publication, Sellmeier conjectured that light–matter interactions could be explained by the idea that particles in matter oscillate harmonically in response to light waves. In particular, his theory was meant to explain the observed 'anomalous' dispersion by Christian Christiansen and August Kundt. Sellmeier's model implied a relation between the refractive index of a material and the light that passes through this material, which is determined by the Sellmeier equation, which was named after him. This equation is still used today in order to determine the dispersion characteristics of materials, far away from absorption peaks in their spectrum.

Sellmeier's way of approaching light–matter interaction was swiftly adopted by the physics community and soon formed the basis of theories of dispersion developed by – among others – Hermann von Helmholtz, Woldemar Voigt and Paul Drude.

== See also ==
- Optical theorem
