= Few-body systems =

Physical systems with a small number of well defined objects

In physics, a few-body system consists of a small number of well-defined structures or point particles. It is usually in-between the two-body and the many-body systems with large N.

== Quantum mechanics ==
In quantum mechanics, examples of few-body systems include light nuclear systems (that is, few-nucleon bound and scattering states), small molecules, light atoms (such as helium in an external electric field), atomic collisions, and quantum dots. A fundamental difficulty in describing few-body systems is that the Schrödinger equation and the classical equations of motion are not analytically solvable for more than two mutually interacting particles even when the underlying forces are precisely known. This is known as the few-body problem. For some three-body systems an exact solution can be obtained iteratively through the Faddeev equations. It can be shown that under certain conditions Faddeev equations should lead to the Efimov effect. Most three-body systems are amenable to extremely accurate numerical solutions that use large sets of basis functions and then variationally optimize the amplitudes of the basis functions. Particular cases are the hydrogen molecular ion or the helium atom. The latter has been solved very precisely using basis sets of Hylleraas or Frankowski-Pekeris functions (see references of the work of G.W.F. Drake and J.D. Morgan III in Helium atom section).

In many cases theory has to resort to approximations to treat few-body systems. These approximations have to be tested by detailed experimental data. Atomic collisions or precision laser spectroscopy are particularly suitable for such tests. The fundamental force underlying atomic systems, the electromagnetic force, is essentially understood. Therefore, any discrepancy found between experiment and theory can be directly related to the theoretical description of few-body effects, or to the existence of new fundamental forces (physics beyond the Standard Model). In nuclear systems, in contrast, the underlying force is much less understood. Furthermore, in atomic collisions the number of particles can be kept small enough so that complete kinematic information about every single particle in the system can be obtained experimentally (see article on kinematically complete experiment). In systems with large particle numbers, in contrast, usually only statistically averaged or collective quantities about the system can be measured.

== Classical mechanics ==
In classical mechanics, the few-body problem is a subset of the N-body problem.
