= Born approximation =

Scattering theory

Generally in scattering theory and in particular in quantum mechanics, the Born approximation consists of taking the incident field in place of the total field as the driving field at each point in the scatterer. The Born approximation is named after Max Born who proposed this approximation in the early days of quantum theory development.

It is the perturbation method applied to scattering by an extended body. It is accurate if the scattered field is small compared to the incident field on the scatterer.

For example, the scattering of radio waves by a light styrofoam column can be approximated by assuming that each part of the plastic is polarized by the same electric field that would be present at that point without the column, and then calculating the scattering as a radiation integral over that polarization distribution.

== Approximate scattering amplitude ==
Starting with a physical model based on the Schrödinger wave equation for scattering from a potential $V$, calculating the scattering amplitude, $f$ requires knowing the full scattering wave function $\psi$,
$$f(\mathbf{k}_f,\mathbf{k}_i) = -\frac{\mu}{2\pi\hbar^2} \int \psi_f^* \, V(\mathbf{r}) \, \psi_i \, d^3r$$
In the Born approximation, the initial and final wave functions are approximated as plane waves:
$$f(\mathbf{k}_f,\mathbf{k}_i) = -\frac{\mu}{2\pi\hbar^2} \int e^{-i\mathbf{k}_f\cdot\mathbf{r}} \, V(\mathbf{r}) \, e^{i\mathbf{k}_i\cdot\mathbf{r}} \,d^3r$$
This is mathematically equivalent to the Fourier transform of the scattering potential from $\mathbf{r}$ to $\mathbf{q}=\mathbf{k}_f - \mathbf{k}_i$:
$$f(\mathbf{k}_f,\mathbf{k}_i) = -\frac{\mu}{2\pi\hbar^2}\int  V(\mathbf{r}) e^{-i\mathbf{q}\cdot\mathbf{r}} d^3r$$
For a spherically symmetric potential the angular integrations can be performed and the scattering amplitude depends only on the polar angle $\theta$ between the input and output directions:
$$f(\theta) = -\frac{2\mu}{\hbar^2q} \int_0^\infty r \sin(qr) \, V(r) \,dr$$
where $q=2k \sin (\theta/2)$ and $k=|\mathbf{k}_f - \mathbf{k}_i|.$

== For the Lippmann–Schwinger equation ==
The Lippmann–Schwinger equation for the scattering state $\vert{\Psi_{\mathbf{p}}^{(\pm)}}\rangle$ with a momentum $\mathbf{p}$ and out-going (+) or in-going (−) boundary conditions is

$$\vert{\Psi_{\mathbf{p}}^{(\pm)}}\rangle = \vert{\Psi_{\mathbf{p}}^{\circ}}\rangle + G^\circ(E_p \pm i\epsilon) V \vert{\Psi_{\mathbf{p}}^{(\pm)}}\rangle,$$

where $G^\circ$ is the free particle Green's function, $\epsilon$ is a positive infinitesimal quantity, and $V$ the interaction potential. $\vert{\Psi_{\mathbf{p}}^{\circ}}\rangle$ is the corresponding free scattering solution sometimes called the incident field. The factor $\vert{\Psi_{\mathbf{p}}^{(\pm)}}\rangle$ on the right hand side is sometimes called the driving field.

The Born approximation sets
$$\vert{\Psi_{\mathbf{p}}^{(\pm)}}\rangle \approx \vert{\Psi_{\mathbf{p}}^{\circ}}\rangle$$
Within the Born approximation, the above equation is expressed as

$$\vert{\Psi_{\mathbf{p}}^{(\pm)}}\rangle = \vert{\Psi_{\mathbf{p}}^{\circ}}\rangle + G^\circ(E_p \pm i\epsilon) V \vert{\Psi_{\mathbf{p}}^{\circ}}\rangle,$$

which is much easier to solve since the right hand side no longer depends on the unknown state $\vert{\Psi_{\mathbf{p}}^{(\pm)}}\rangle$.

The obtained solution is the starting point of a perturbation series known as the Born series.

=== Scattering amplitude ===
Using the outgoing free Green's function for a particle with mass $m$ in coordinate space,

$$G^{(+)}(\mathbf r, \mathbf r')=-\frac{2m}{\hbar^2}\frac{e^{+ik|\mathbf r-\mathbf r'|}}{4\pi|\mathbf r-\mathbf r'|}$$

one can extract the Born approximation to the scattering amplitude from the Born approximation to the Lippmann–Schwinger equation above,

$$f_B(\theta)=-\frac{m}{2\pi\hbar^2} \int e^{-i\mathbf{q} \cdot \mathbf{r}} \, V(\mathbf r) \,d^3r,$$

where $\theta$ is the angle between the incident wave vector $\mathbf k$ and the scattered wave vector $\mathbf k'$, $\mathbf q=\mathbf k'-\mathbf k$ is the transferred momentum. The Born scattering amplitude is proportional to the Fourier transform of the potential.

In the centrally symmetric potential $V=V(r)$, the scattering amplitude becomes

$$f_B(\theta) = -\frac{2m}{\hbar^2} \int_0^\infty r \, V(r) \, \frac{\sin (qr)}{q} \, dr$$

where $q=|\mathbf q|=2k\sin(\theta/2).$ In the Born approximation for centrally symmetric field, the scattering amplitude and thus the cross section $\sigma$ depends on the momentum $p=k/\hbar$ and the scattering amplitude $\theta$ only through the combination $p\sin(\theta/2)$.

== Applications ==
The Born approximation is used in several different physical contexts.

In neutron scattering, the first-order Born approximation is almost always adequate, except for neutron optical phenomena like internal total reflection in a neutron guide, or grazing-incidence small-angle scattering. Using the first Born approximation, it has been shown that the scattering amplitude for a scattering potential $V(\mathbf r)$ is the same as the Fourier transform of the scattering potential . Using this concept, the electronic analogue of Fourier optics has been theoretically studied in monolayer graphene. The Born approximation has also been used to calculate conductivity in bilayer graphene and to approximate the propagation of long-wavelength waves in elastic media.

The same ideas have also been applied to studying the movements of seismic waves through the Earth.

== Distorted-wave Born approximation ==
The Born approximation is simplest when the incident waves $\vert{\Psi_{\mathbf{p}}^{\circ}}\rangle$ are plane waves. That is, the scatterer is treated as a perturbation to free space or to a homogeneous medium.

In the distorted-wave Born approximation (DWBA), the incident waves are solutions $\vert{\Psi_{\mathbf{p}}^{1}}^{(\pm)}\rangle$ to a part $V^1$ of the problem $V=V^1 + V^2$ that is treated by some other method, either analytical or numerical. The interaction of interest $V$ is treated as a perturbation $V^2$ to some system $V^1$ that can be solved by some other method. For nuclear reactions, numerical optical model waves are used. For scattering of charged particles by charged particles, analytic solutions for coulomb scattering are used. This gives the non-Born preliminary equation

$$\vert{\Psi_{\mathbf{p}}^{1}}^{(\pm)}\rangle = \vert{\Psi_{\mathbf{p}}^{\circ}}\rangle + G^\circ(E_p \pm i0) V^{1} \vert{\Psi_{\mathbf{p}}^{1}}^{(\pm)}\rangle$$

and the Born approximation

$$\vert{\Psi_{\mathbf{p}}^{(\pm)}}\rangle = \vert{\Psi_{\mathbf{p}}^{1}}^{(\pm)}\rangle + G^1(E_p \pm i0) V^{2} \vert{\Psi_{\mathbf{p}}^{1}}^{(\pm)}\rangle.$$

Applications include bremsstrahlung and the photoelectric effect. For a charged-particle-induced direct nuclear reaction, the procedure is used twice. In condensed-matter research, DWBA is used to analyze grazing-incidence small-angle scattering.

== See also ==
- Born series
- Lippmann–Schwinger equation
- Dyson series
- Partial-wave analysis
- Rayleigh–Gans approximation
