= Richard E. Cutkosky =

American physicist

- Born: Richard E. Cutkosky; July 29, 1928
- Died: June 17, 1993 (aged 64)
- Known for: Cutkosky cutting rules

Richard Edwin Cutkosky (29 July 1928 – 17 June 1993) was a physicist, best known for the Cutkosky cutting rules in quantum field theory, which give a simple way to calculate the discontinuity of the scattering amplitude by Feynman diagrams. Richard Edwin Cutkowsky was born in Minneapolis as son of Oscar F. and Edna M. (Nelson) Cutkosky. His entire career was related to Carnegie, Pittsburgh, Pennsylvania. At the Carnegie Institute of Technology he made his Bachelor and Master of Science both in 1950, followed by a Doctor of Philosophy in 1953. 1954-1961 he was assistant professor of physics at the Carnegie Mellon University, professor since 1961 and the first Buhl professor since 1963 until his death in 1993. He was a fellow of the American Physical Society and of the American Association for the Advancement of Science. He was married with Patricia A. Klepfer, August 28,1952. Children: Mark, Carol, Martha.

== Publications ==
- R. E. Cutkosky (1960), "Singularities and Discontinuities of Feynman Amplitudes", J. Math. Phys., 1 (5): 429, Bibcode:1960JMP.....1..429C, doi:10.1063/1.1703676
