= Partial-wave analysis =

Technique in quantum mechanics for solving scattering problems

Partial-wave analysis, in the context of quantum mechanics, refers to a technique for solving scattering problems by decomposing each wave into its constituent angular-momentum components and solving using boundary conditions. Partial wave analysis is typically useful for low energy scattering where only a few angular momentum components dominate. At high energy, where scattering is weak, an alternative called the Born approximation is used.

== Preliminary scattering theory ==
A steady beam of particles scatters off a spherically symmetric potential $V(r)$, which is short-ranged, so that for large distances $r \to \infty$, the particles behave like free particles. The incoming beam is assumed to be a collimated plane wave $\exp(ikz)$ traveling along the z axis. Because the beam is switched on for times long compared to the time of interaction of the particles with the scattering potential, a steady state is assumed. This means that the stationary Schrödinger equation for the wave function $\Psi(\mathbf r)$ representing the particle beam should be solved:

$$\left[-\frac{\hbar^2}{2m} \nabla^2 + V(r)\right] \Psi(\mathbf r) = E\Psi(\mathbf r).$$

We make the following ansatz:

$$\Psi(\mathbf r) = \Psi_0(\mathbf r) + \Psi_\text{s}(\mathbf r),$$

where $\Psi_0(\mathbf r) \propto \exp(ikz)$ is the incoming plane wave, and $\Psi_\text{s}(\mathbf r)$ is a scattered part perturbing the original wave function.

It is the asymptotic form of $\Psi_\text{s}(\mathbf r)$ that is of interest, because observations near the scattering center (e.g. an atomic nucleus) are mostly not feasible, and detection of particles takes place far away from the origin. At large distances, the particles should behave like free particles, and $\Psi_\text{s}(\mathbf r)$ should therefore be a solution to the free Schrödinger equation. For a spherically symmetric potential, these solutions should be outgoing spherical waves,$\Psi_\text{s}(\mathbf r) \propto \exp(ikr) / r$ at large distances. Thus the asymptotic form of the scattered wave is chosen as

$$\Psi_\text{s}(\mathbf r) \to f(\theta, k) \frac{\exp(ikr)}{r},$$

where $f(\theta, k)$ is the so-called scattering amplitude, which is in this case only dependent on the elevation angle $\theta$ and the energy. This gives the following asymptotic expression for the entire wave function:

$$\Psi(\mathbf r) \to \Psi^{(+)}(\mathbf r) = \exp(ikz) + f(\theta, k) \frac{\exp(ikr)}{r}.$$

== Partial-wave expansion ==
In case of a spherically symmetric potential $V(\mathbf r) = V(r)$, the scattering wave function may be expanded in spherical harmonics, which reduce to Legendre polynomials because of azimuthal symmetry (no dependence on $\phi$):

$$\Psi(\mathbf r) = \sum_{\ell=0}^{\infty} \frac{u_\ell(r)}{r} P_\ell(\cos\theta).$$

In the standard scattering problem, the incoming beam is assumed to take the form of a plane wave of wave number k, which can be decomposed into partial waves using the plane-wave expansion in terms of spherical Bessel functions and Legendre polynomials:

$$\psi_\text{in}(\mathbf r) = e^{ikz} = \sum_{\ell = 0}^\infty (2 \ell + 1) i^\ell j_\ell(kr) P_\ell(\cos \theta).$$

Here we have assumed a spherical coordinate system in which the z axis is aligned with the beam direction. The radial part of this wave function consists solely of the spherical Bessel function, which can be rewritten as a sum of two spherical Hankel functions:

$$j_\ell(kr) = \frac{1}{2} \left(h_\ell^{(1)}(kr) + h_\ell^{(2)}(kr)\right).$$

This has physical significance: h_{ℓ}^{(2)} asymptotically (i.e. for large r) behaves as i^{−(ℓ+1)}e^{ikr}/(kr) and is thus an outgoing wave, whereas h_{ℓ}^{(1)} asymptotically behaves as i^{ℓ+1}e^{−ikr}/(kr) and is thus an incoming wave. The incoming wave is unaffected by the scattering, while the outgoing wave is modified by a factor known as the partial-wave S-matrix element S_{ℓ}:

$$\frac{u_\ell(r)}{r} \stackrel{r \to \infty}{\longrightarrow} \frac{i^\ell k}{\sqrt{2 \pi}} \left(h_\ell^{(1)}(k r) + S_\ell h_\ell^{(2)}(k r)\right),$$

where u_{ℓ}(r)/r is the radial component of the actual wave function. The scattering phase shift δ_{ℓ} is defined as half of the phase of S_{ℓ}:

$$S_\ell = e^{2 i \delta_\ell}.$$

If flux is not lost, then |S_{ℓ}| = 1, and thus the phase shift is real. This is typically the case, unless the potential has an imaginary absorptive component, which is often used in phenomenological models to simulate loss due to other reaction channels.

Therefore, the full asymptotic wave function is

$$\psi(\mathbf r) \stackrel{r \to \infty}{\longrightarrow} \sum_{\ell = 0}^\infty (2 \ell + 1) i^\ell \frac{h_\ell^{(1)}(k r) + S_\ell h_\ell^{(2)}(k r)}{2} P_\ell(\cos \theta).$$

Subtracting ψ_{in} yields the asymptotic outgoing wave function:

$$\psi_\text{out}(\mathbf r) \stackrel{r \to \infty}{\longrightarrow} \sum_{\ell = 0}^\infty (2 \ell + 1) i^\ell \frac{S_\ell - 1}{2} h_\ell^{(2)}(k r) P_\ell(\cos \theta).$$

Making use of the asymptotic behavior of the spherical Hankel functions, one obtains

$$\psi_\text{out}(\mathbf r) \stackrel{r \to \infty}{\longrightarrow} \frac{e^{i k r}}{r} \sum_{\ell = 0}^\infty (2 \ell + 1) \frac{S_\ell - 1}{2 i k} P_\ell(\cos \theta).$$

Since the scattering amplitude f(θ, k) is defined from

$$\psi_\text{out}(\mathbf r) \stackrel{r \to \infty}{\longrightarrow} \frac{e^{i k r}}{r} f(\theta, k),$$

it follows that

$$f(\theta, k) = \sum_{\ell = 0}^\infty (2 \ell + 1) \frac{S_\ell - 1}{2 i k} P_\ell(\cos \theta) = \sum_{\ell = 0}^\infty (2 \ell + 1) \frac{e^{i \delta_\ell} \sin\delta_\ell}{k} P_\ell(\cos \theta),$$

and thus the differential cross section is given by

$$\frac{d\sigma}{d\Omega} = |f(\theta, k)|^2 = \frac{1}{k^2} \left| \sum_{\ell=0}^\infty (2\ell+1) e^{i\delta_\ell} \sin \delta_\ell P_\ell(\cos \theta) \right|^2.$$

This works for any short-ranged interaction. For long-ranged interactions (such as the Coulomb interaction), the summation over ℓ may not converge. The general approach for such problems consist in treating the Coulomb interaction separately from the short-ranged interaction, as the Coulomb problem can be solved exactly in terms of Coulomb functions, which take on the role of the Hankel functions in this problem.

== See also ==
- Levinson's theorem
