= Frederic de Hoffmann =

Nuclear physicist (1924–1989)

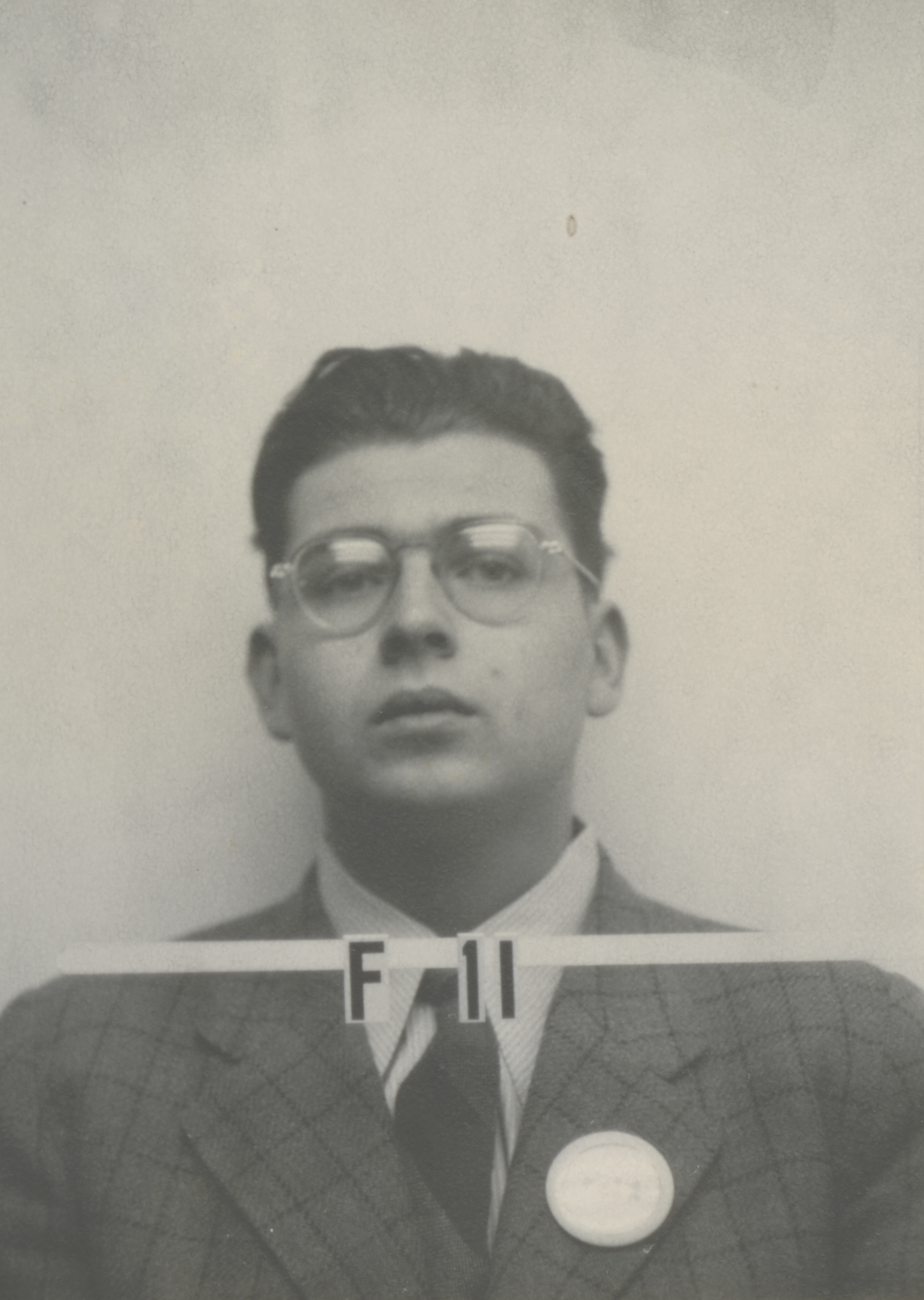
Frederic de Hoffman Los Alamos badge

Frederic de Hoffmann (July 8, 1924 – October 4, 1989) was an Austrian-born American nuclear physicist who worked on the Manhattan Project. He was born in Vienna, Austria and died in San Diego, California. He came to the United States of America in 1941 and graduated from Harvard University in 1945. He also received a master's in 1947 and a doctorate in 1948. Before graduating, de Hoffmann was sent to Los Alamos National Laboratory in 1944 where he assisted Edward Teller in the development of the Hydrogen bomb. Frederic de Hoffmann was an advocate of peaceful atomic energy.

After leaving Los Alamos, de Hoffmann collaborated with Hans Bethe and Silvan Schweber on a textbook called Mesons and Fields and became chairman of the Committee of Senior Reviewers of the United States Atomic Energy Commission. He received his PhD from Julian Schwinger in 1948.

Frederic De Hoffmann moved to the General Dynamics Corporation in 1955. That year he was recruited by John Jay Hopkins to found General Atomics and serve as its first president. This organization's purpose was to manufacture nuclear reactors for energy production, and sell them on the open market. In the late '50s he organized Project Orion, a plan for a spaceship to be propelled by nuclear bombs.

He helped found the University of California's campus in San Diego, the University of California, San Diego.

De Hoffmann joined the Salk Institute for Biological Studies in 1970 and served as its president for 18 years. He was also the chairman and chief executive officer of the Salk Institute Biotechnology-Industry Associates Inc. When de Hoffmann retired in 1988 he was named the institute's president emeritus. He died in 1989 of AIDS, which he contracted in 1984 from an infected blood transfusion he received during surgery.

== See also ==
- Nuclear thermal rocket
- Optical theorem
- Project Rover
- Shock waves in astrophysics
