= Chii-Dong Lin =

Taiwanese physicist

Chii-Dong Lin (born 1946) is a Taiwanese physicist.

Lin was born in 1946, and is a native of Changhua County. After graduating from National Taiwan University in 1969, he earned a doctorate from the University of Chicago in 1974 and was a postdoctoral fellow at Harvard University until 1976, when he joined the Kansas State University faculty. In 1985, Lin was elected a fellow of the American Physical Society, "[f]or his pioneering hyperspherical coordinate analyses of two electron atoms and ions, and his contribution to the development of the relativistic random phase approximation for atomic photoionization. In 1990, Lin was appointed to a distinguished professorship.
