= Kinematically complete experiment =

Type of experiment in accelerator physics

In accelerator physics, a kinematically complete experiment is an experiment in which all kinematic parameters of all collision products are determined. If the final state of the collision involves n particles 3n momentum components (3 Cartesian coordinates for each particle) need to be determined. However, these components are linked to each other by momentum conservation in each direction (3 equations) and energy conservation (1 equation) so that only 3n-4 components are linearly independent. Therefore, the measurement of 3n-4 momentum components constitutes a kinematically complete experiment.

If the final state involves only two particles (e.g. in the Rutherford experiment on elastic scattering) then only one particle needs to be detected. However, for processes leading to three collision products, like e.g. single ionization of the target atom, then two particles need to be momentum-analyzed (for one of them it is sufficient to measure two momentum components) and measured in coincidence. Any pair of the three final state particles (i.e. the scattered projectile, the ejected electron, and the recoiling target ion) can be detected. The first kinematically complete experiment on single ionization was performed for electron impact. There, the scattered projectile electron and the ejected electron were momentum-analyzed. For ion impact, such an experiment is much more challenging because of the much larger projectile mass. As a result, the projectile scattering as well as the projectile energy loss relative to the initial energy are by many orders of magnitude smaller than for electron impact and are not measurable with standard techniques for fast heavy ions. Furthermore, only with the advent of cold target recoil-ion momentum spectroscopy (COLTRIMS) could the recoil ions be measured with sufficient momentum resolution. The first kinematically complete experiment on single ionization by ion impact was performed by momentum analyzing the recoil ions and the ejected electrons. For proton impact at much smaller energy kinematically complete experiments were also performed by momentum-analyzing the scattered projectiles and the recoil ions. These studies play an important role in the context of the few-body problem (see the article on few-body systems).

Other processes involving more than two final state particles for which kinematically complete experiments were performed include double ionization of the target by electron impact, transfer-ionization (i.e. one target electron is ejected to the continuum while a second electron is captured by the projectile) by ion impact and dissociative capture in p + H_{2} collisions, where the capture of an electron to the projectile leads to a fragmentation of the target molecule. Studies on double ionization and transfer-ionization revealed the important role of electron-electron correlation effects in processes involving multiple electrons. In dissociative capture pronounced quantum-mechanical interference was observed, from which detailed information about the phase angle, which in turn provides sensitive information on the few-body dynamics, was obtained.
