= Roger G. Newton =

German-born American physicist (1924–2018)

Roger Gerhard Newton (né Neuweg; November 30, 1924 – April 14, 2018) was a German-born American physicist.

Newton was born in Landsberg an der Warthe, Weimar Germany (present day Gorzów Wielkopolski) on November 30, 1924, to parents Margaret Blume and Arthur Newton, a dentist. Because of their Jewish heritage, Newton's family was targeted by the Gestapo. Though Newton enrolled at the University of Berlin, he and his family moved to Buffalo, New York after World War II. After serving in the United States Army, he applied to various American universities, intending to study physics. Receiving an encouraging reply by John U. Monro at Harvard University, he submitted letters of recommendation from his high school teachers and was admitted as a junior, as he had graduated from a German high school. He enrolled in 1947 and completed his bachelor's degree in 1949. Shortly after earning his doctorate under the supervision of Julian Schwinger in 1953, Newton married Ruth Gordon. He worked for the Institute for Advanced Study until joining the Indiana University Bloomington faculty in 1955. He became a full professor in 1960, and was named a distinguished professor in 1978. Over the course of his career, Newton served as associate editor of the American Journal of Physics and Inverse Problems (1985-1990) and head editor of the Journal of Mathematical Physics. Additionally, he was granted fellowship into the American Physical Society and American Association for the Advancement of Science. Newton is well known for his book Scattering Theory of Waves and Particles. Newton died at home on April 14, 2018, aged 93.
