= Scattering amplitude =

Probability amplitude in quantum scattering theory

In quantum physics, the scattering amplitude is the probability amplitude of the outgoing spherical wave relative to the incoming plane wave in a stationary-state scattering process.

== Formulation ==
Scattering in quantum mechanics begins with a physical model based on the Schrödinger wave equation for probability amplitude $\psi$:
$$-\frac{\hbar^2}{2\mu}\nabla^2\psi + V\psi = E\psi$$
where $\mu$ is the reduced mass of two scattering particles and E is the energy of relative motion. For scattering problems, a stationary (time-independent) wavefunction is sought with behavior at large distances (asymptotic form) in two parts. First a plane wave represents the incoming source and, second, a spherical wave emanating from the scattering center placed at the coordinate origin represents the scattered wave:
$$\psi(r\rightarrow \infty) \sim e^{i\mathbf{k}_i\cdot\mathbf{r}} + f(\mathbf{k}_f,\mathbf{k}_i)\frac{e^{i\mathbf{k}_f\cdot\mathbf{r}}}{r}$$
The scattering amplitude, $f(\mathbf{k}_f,\mathbf{k}_i)$, represents the amplitude that the target will scatter into the direction $\mathbf{k}_f$. In general the scattering amplitude requires knowing the full scattering wavefunction:
$$f(\mathbf{k}_f,\mathbf{k}_i) = -\frac{\mu}{2\pi\hbar^2}\int \psi_f^* V(\mathbf{r}) \psi_i d^3r$$
For weak interactions a perturbation series can be applied; the lowest order is called the Born approximation.

For a spherically symmetric scattering center, the plane wave is described by the wavefunction

$$\psi(\mathbf{r}) = e^{ikz} + f(\theta)\frac{e^{ikr}}{r} \;,$$

where $\mathbf{r}\equiv(x,y,z)$ is the position vector; $r\equiv|\mathbf{r}|$; $e^{ikz}$ is the incoming plane wave with the wavenumber k along the z axis; $e^{ikr}/r$ is the outgoing spherical wave; θ is the scattering angle (angle between the incident and scattered direction); and $f(\theta)$ is the scattering amplitude.

The dimension of the scattering amplitude is length. The scattering amplitude is a probability amplitude; the differential cross-section as a function of scattering angle is given as its modulus squared,

$$d\sigma = |f(\theta)|^2 \;d\Omega.$$

== Unitary condition ==
When conservation of number of particles holds true during scattering, it leads to a unitary condition for the scattering amplitude. In the general case, we have

$$f(\mathbf{n},\mathbf{n}') -f^*(\mathbf{n}',\mathbf{n})= \frac{ik}{2\pi} \int f(\mathbf{n},\mathbf{n}'')f^*(\mathbf{n},\mathbf{n}'')\,d\Omega''$$

Optical theorem follows from here by setting $\mathbf n=\mathbf n'.$

In the centrally symmetric field, the unitary condition becomes

$$\mathrm{Im} f(\theta)=\frac{k}{4\pi}\int f(\gamma)f(\gamma')\,d\Omega''$$

where $\gamma$ and $\gamma'$ are the angles between $\mathbf{n}$ and $\mathbf{n}'$ and some direction $\mathbf{n}''$. This condition puts a constraint on the allowed form for $f(\theta)$, i.e., the real and imaginary part of the scattering amplitude are not independent in this case. For example, if $|f(\theta)|$ in $f=|f|e^{2i\alpha}$ is known (say, from the measurement of the cross section), then $\alpha(\theta)$ can be determined such that $f(\theta)$ is uniquely determined within the alternative $f(\theta)\rightarrow -f^*(\theta)$.

== Partial wave expansion ==
In the partial wave expansion the scattering amplitude is represented as a sum over the partial waves,

$$f=\sum_{\ell=0}^\infty (2\ell+1) f_\ell P_\ell(\cos \theta)$$,

where f_{ℓ} is the partial scattering amplitude and P_{ℓ} are the Legendre polynomials. The partial amplitude can be expressed via the partial wave S-matrix element S_{ℓ} ($=e^{2i\delta_\ell}$) and the scattering phase shift δ_{ℓ} as

$$f_\ell = \frac{S_\ell-1}{2ik} = \frac{e^{2i\delta_\ell}-1}{2ik} = \frac{e^{i\delta_\ell} \sin\delta_\ell}{k} = \frac{1}{k\cot\delta_\ell-ik} \;.$$

Then the total cross section

$$\sigma = \int |f(\theta)|^2d\Omega$$,

can be expanded as

$$\sigma = \sum_{l=0}^\infty \sigma_l, \quad \text{where} \quad \sigma_l = 4\pi(2l+1)|f_l|^2=\frac{4\pi}{k^2}(2l+1)\sin^2\delta_l$$

is the partial cross section. The total cross section is also equal to $\sigma=(4\pi/k)\,\mathrm{Im} f(0)$ due to optical theorem.

For $\theta\neq 0$, we can write

$$f=\frac{1}{2ik}\sum_{\ell=0}^\infty (2\ell+1) e^{2i\delta_l} P_\ell(\cos \theta).$$

== X-rays ==
The scattering length for X-rays is the Thomson scattering length or classical electron radius, r_{0}.

== Neutrons ==
The nuclear neutron scattering process involves the coherent neutron scattering length, often described by b.

== Quantum mechanical formalism ==
A quantum mechanical approach is given by the S matrix formalism.

== Measurement ==
The scattering amplitude can be determined by the scattering length in the low-energy regime.

== See also ==
- Levinson's theorem
- Plane wave expansion
- Veneziano amplitude
