= Rayleigh–Gans approximation =

Rayleigh–Gans approximation, also known as Rayleigh–Gans–Debye approximation and Rayleigh–Gans–Born approximation, is an approximate solution to light scattering by optically soft particles. Optical softness implies that the relative refractive index of particle is close to that of the surrounding medium. The approximation holds for particles of arbitrary shape that are relatively small but can be larger than Rayleigh scattering limits.

The theory was derived by Lord Rayleigh in 1881 and was applied to homogeneous spheres, spherical shells, radially inhomogeneous spheres and infinite cylinders. Peter Debye has contributed to the theory in 1881. The theory for homogeneous sphere was rederived by Richard Gans in 1925. The approximation is analogous to Born approximation in quantum mechanics.

== Theory ==
The validity conditions for the approximation can be denoted as:

$$|n-1| \ll 1$$
$$kd|n-1| \ll 1$$

$k$ is the wavevector of the light ($k=\frac{2 \pi}{\lambda}$), whereas $d$ refers to the linear dimension of the particle. $n$ is the complex refractive index of the particle. The first condition allows for a simplification in expressing the material polarizability in the derivation below. The second condition is a statement of the Born approximation, that is, that the incident field is not greatly altered within one particle so that each volume element is considered to be illuminated by an intensity and phase determined only by its position relative to the incident wave, unaffected by scattering from other volume elements.

The particle is divided into small volume elements, which are treated as independent Rayleigh scatterers. For an inbound light with s polarization, the scattering amplitude contribution from each volume element is given as:

$$dS_1(\theta, \phi)=i \frac{3}{4 \pi} k^3 \left( \frac{n^2-1}{n^2+2} \right) e^{i \delta} dV$$

where $\delta$ denotes the phase difference due to each individual element, and the fraction in parentheses is the electric polarizability as found from the refractive index using the Clausius–Mossotti relation. Under the condition (n-1) << 1, this factor can be approximated as 2(n-1)/3. The phases $\delta$ affecting the scattering from each volume element are dependent only on their positions with respect to the incoming wave and the scattering direction. Integrating, the scattering amplitude function thus obtains:

$$S_1(\theta, \phi)  \approx    \frac{i}{2 \pi}k^3(n-1) \int e^{i \delta} dV$$

in which only the final integral, which describes the interfering phases contributing to the scattering direction (θ, φ), remains to be solved according to the particular geometry of the scatterer. Calling V the entire volume of the scattering object, over which this integration is performed, one can write that scattering parameter for scattering with the electric field polarization normal to the plane of incidence (s polarization) as

$$S_1=\frac{i}{2 \pi}k^3(n-1) V R(\theta, \phi)$$

and for polarization in the plane of incidence (p polarization) as

$$S_2=\frac{i}{2 \pi}k^3(n-1) V R(\theta, \phi)cos \theta$$

where $R(\theta, \phi)$ denotes the "form factor" of the scatterer:

$$R(\theta, \phi)=\frac{1}{V} \int{}{} e^{i \delta} dV$$

In order to only find intensities we can define P as the squared magnitude of the form factor:

$$P(\theta, \phi)=\left( \frac{1}{V^2} \right) \left| \int e^{i \delta} dV \right|^2$$

Then the scattered radiation intensity, relative to the intensity of the incident wave, for each polarization can be written as:

$$I_1/I_0 = \left(\frac{k^4 V^2}{4 \pi^2 r^2} \right) (n-1)^2 P(\theta, \phi)$$
$$I_2/I_0 = \left(\frac{k^4 V^2}{4 \pi^2 r^2} \right) (n-1)^2 P(\theta, \phi)cos^2 \theta$$

where r is the distance from the scatterer to the observation point. Per the optical theorem, absorption cross section is given as:

$$C_{abs}=2kV \mathbb{Im}(n)$$

which is independent of the polarization.

== Applications ==
Rayleigh–Gans approximation has been applied on the calculation of the optical cross sections of fractal aggregates. The theory was also applied to anisotropic spheres for nanostructured polycrystalline alumina and turbidity calculations on biological structures such as lipid vesicles and bacteria.

A nonlinear Rayleigh−Gans−Debye model was used to investigate second-harmonic generation in malachite green molecules adsorbed on polystyrene particles.

== See also ==
- Mie scattering
- Anomalous diffraction theory
- Discrete dipole approximation
- Gans theory
