= Atmospheric optics ray-tracing codes =

Atmospheric optics ray tracing codes - this article list codes for light scattering using ray-tracing technique to study atmospheric optics phenomena such as rainbows and halos. Such particles can be large raindrops or hexagonal ice crystals. Such codes are one of many approaches to calculations of light scattering by particles.

== Geometric optics (ray tracing) ==
Ray tracing techniques can be applied to study light scattering by spherical and non-spherical particles under the condition that the size of a particle is much larger than the wavelength of light. The light can be considered as collection of separate rays with width of rays much larger than the wavelength but smaller than a particle. Rays hitting the particle undergoes reflection, refraction and diffraction. These rays exit in various directions with different amplitudes and phases. Such ray tracing techniques are used to describe optical phenomena such as rainbow of halo on hexagonal ice crystals for large particles. Review of several mathematical techniques is provided in series of publications.

The 46° halo was first explained as being caused by refractions through ice crystals in 1679 by the French physicist Edmé Mariotte (1620–1684) in terms of light refraction Jacobowitz in 1971 was the first to apply the ray-tracing technique to hexagonal ice crystal. Wendling et al. (1979) extended Jacobowitz's work from hexagonal ice particle with infinite length to finite length and combined Monte Carlo technique to the ray-tracing simulations.

== Classification ==
The compilation contains information about the electromagnetic scattering by hexagonal ice crystals, large raindrops, and relevant links and applications.

=== Codes for light scattering by hexagonal ice crystals ===
| Year | Name | Authors | References | Language | Short Description |
|---|---|---|---|---|---|
| 2017 | PGOM | Bingqiang Sun, Ping Yang, George Kattawar, Xiaodong Zhang | source codes | Fortran 90 | Advanced version of beam (a bundle of rays) tracing and splitting techniques and physical optics method for an aggregate of eight hexagonal columns. The package also contains a version of the invariant-imbedding T-matrix method (IITM) for spheroids. |
| | Halosim | Les Cowley and Michael Schroeder | Atmospheric Optics site | graphical user interface | It creates simulations by accurately tracing up to several million light rays through mathematical models of ice crystals. |
| 2010 | Halopoint2 | Jukka Ruoskanen | webpage | graphical user interface | Ray-tracing code for various ice crystals with graphical user interface |
| 2008 | HALOSKY | Stanley David Gedzelman | source codes | | Ray-tracing codes for light scattering by hexagonal ice crystals. |
| 1996 | Ray tracing | Andreas Macke | source codes | Fortran90 | Ray-tracing codes for light scattering by polyhedral shaped ice crystals. |

== Relevant scattering codes ==
- Discrete dipole approximation codes
- Codes for electromagnetic scattering by cylinders
- Codes for electromagnetic scattering by spheres
