= Single-scattering albedo =

Measurement in astronomy

Single-scattering albedo is the ratio of scattering efficiency to total extinction efficiency (which is also termed "attenuance", a sum of scattering and absorption). Most often it is defined for small-particle scattering of electromagnetic waves. Single-scattering albedo is unitless, and a value of unity implies that all particle extinction is due to scattering; conversely, a single-scattering albedo of zero implies that all extinction is due to absorption.

For spherical particles, one can calculate single-scattering albedo from Mie theory and knowledge of bulk properties of material such as refractive index. For non-spherical particles one could use discrete dipole approximation or other methods of computational electromagnetics. The albedo of particles of shapes that are easily parameterized in non-standard coordinate systems may be determined through solutions of Maxwell's equation analogs in such coordinate systems. Scattering albedo equations have yet to be determined in elliptical, toroidal, conical, and many others. Derivation and solutions to such equations is a field of ongoing research.

== See also ==
- Light scattering by particles
- Albedo
