= Light scattering by particles =

Process by which dust, particulates, etc. scatter light

Light scattering by particles is the process by which small particles (e.g. ice crystals, dust, atmospheric particulates, cosmic dust, and blood cells) scatter light causing optical phenomena such as the blue color of the sky, and halos.

Maxwell's equations are the basis of theoretical and computational methods describing light scattering, but since exact solutions to Maxwell's equations are only known for selected particle geometries (such as spherical), light scattering by particles is a branch of computational electromagnetics dealing with electromagnetic radiation scattering and absorption by particles.

In case of geometries for which analytical solutions are known (such as spheres, cluster of spheres, infinite cylinders), the solutions are typically calculated in terms of infinite series. In case of more complex geometries and for inhomogeneous particles the original Maxwell's equations are discretized and solved. Multiple-scattering effects of light scattering by particles are treated by radiative transfer techniques (see, e.g. atmospheric radiative transfer codes).

The relative size of a scattering particle is defined by its size parameter x, which is the ratio of its characteristic dimension to its wavelength:

$x = \frac{2 \pi r} {\lambda}.$

== Exact computational methods ==
=== Finite-difference time-domain method ===
The FDTD method belongs in the general class of grid-based differential time-domain numerical modeling methods. The time-dependent Maxwell's equations (in partial differential form) are discretized using central-difference approximations to the space and time partial derivatives. The resulting finite-difference equations are solved in either software or hardware in a leapfrog manner: the electric field vector components in a volume of space are solved at a given instant in time; then the magnetic field vector components in the same spatial volume are solved at the next instant in time; and the process is repeated over and over again until the desired transient or steady-state electromagnetic field behavior is fully evolved.

=== T-matrix ===
The technique is also known as null field method and extended boundary technique method (EBCM). Matrix elements are obtained by matching boundary conditions for solutions of Maxwell equations. The incident, transmitted, and scattered field are expanded into spherical vector wave functions.

== Computational approximations ==
=== Mie approximation ===
Scattering from any spherical particles with arbitrary size parameter is explained by the Mie theory. Mie theory, also called Lorenz-Mie theory or Lorenz-Mie-Debye theory, is a complete analytical solution of Maxwell's equations for the scattering of electromagnetic radiation by spherical particles (Bohren and Huffman, 1998).

For more complex shapes such as coated spheres, multispheres, spheroids, and infinite cylinders there are extensions which express the solution in terms of infinite series. There are codes available to study light scattering in Mie approximation for spheres, layered spheres, and multiple spheres and cylinders.

=== Discrete dipole approximation ===
There are several techniques for computing scattering of radiation by particles of arbitrary shape. The discrete dipole approximation is an approximation of the continuum target by a finite array of polarizable points. The points acquire dipole moments in response to the local electric field. The dipoles of these points interact with one another via their electric fields. There are DDA codes available to calculate light scattering properties in DDA approximation.

== Approximate methods ==
| Approximation | Refractive index | Size parameter | Phase shift |
|---|---|---|---|
| Rayleigh scattering | abs(mx) very small | very small | |
| Geometric optics | | very large | very large |
| Anomalous Diffraction Theory | abs(m-1) very small | x large | |
| Complex Angular Momentum | moderate m | large x | |

=== Rayleigh scattering ===
Rayleigh scattering regime is the scattering of light, or other electromagnetic radiation, by particles much smaller than the wavelength of the light. Rayleigh scattering can be defined as scattering in small size parameter regime $x \ll 1$.

Light rays enter a raindrop from one direction (typically a straight line from the Sun), reflect off the back of the raindrop, and fan out as they leave the raindrop. The light leaving the raindrop is spread over a wide angle, with a maximum intensity at 40.89–42°.

=== Geometric optics (ray-tracing) ===
Ray tracing techniques can approximate light scattering by not only spherical particles but ones of any specified shape (and orientation) so long as the size and critical dimensions of a particle are much larger than the wavelength of light. The light can be considered as a collection of rays whose widths are much larger than the wavelength but small compared to the particle itself. Each ray hitting the particle may undergo (partial) reflection and/or refraction. These rays exit in directions thereby computed with their full power or (when partial reflection is involved) with the incident power divided among two (or more) exiting rays. Just as with lenses and other optical components, ray tracing determines the light emanating from a single scatterer, and combining that result statistically for a large number of randomly oriented and positioned scatterers, one can describe atmospheric optical phenomena such as rainbows due to water droplets and halos due to ice crystals. There are atmospheric optics ray-tracing codes available.

== See also ==
- Codes for electromagnetic scattering by spheres
- Codes for electromagnetic scattering by cylinders
- Discrete dipole approximation codes
- Finite-difference time-domain method
- Scattering
