= Gans theory =

Gans theory or Mie-Gans theory is the extension of Mie theory for the case of spheroidal particles. It gives the scattering characteristics of both oblate and prolate spheroidal particles much smaller than the excitation wavelength. Since it is a solution of the Maxwell equations it should technically not be called a theory.

The theory is named after Richard Gans who first published the solution for gold particles in 1912 in an article entitled "Über die Form ultramikroskopischer Goldteilchen". A subsequent article in 1915 discussed the case of silver particles.

In Gans theory, the absorption is only dependent on the aspect ratio of the particles and not on the absolute dimensions. This dependence is introduced through so called polarization- or shape factors related to the three dimensions of the particle. For the case of spheroids, this reduces to only two different factors since the particle is rotational symmetric around one axis.

It is currently being applied in the field of nanotechnology to characterize silver and gold nanorods. A popular alternative for this is the Discrete dipole approximation (DDA) method. Gans theory gives the exact solution for spheroidal particles; real nanorods, however, have a more cylindrical shape. Using DDA, it is possible to better model the exact shape of the particles. As the name suggests, this will only give an approximation.

== See also ==
- Discrete dipole approximation
- Mie theory
- Rayleigh–Gans approximation
