= Codes for electromagnetic scattering by spheres =

Codes for electromagnetic scattering by spheres - this article list codes for electromagnetic scattering by a homogeneous sphere, layered sphere, and cluster of spheres.

== Solution techniques ==
Majority of existing codes for calculation of electromagnetic scattering by a single sphere is based on Mie theory which is an analytical solution of Maxwell's equations in terms of infinite series. Other approximations to scattering by a single sphere include: Debye series, ray tracing (geometrical optics), ray tracing including the effects of interference between rays, Airy theory, Rayleigh scattering, diffraction approximation. There are many phenomena related to light scattering by spherical particles such as resonances, surface waves, plasmons, near-field scattering. Even though Mie theory offers convenient and fast way of solving light scattering problem by homogeneous spherical particles, there are other techniques, such as discrete dipole approximation, FDTD, T-matrix, which can also be used for such tasks.

== Classification ==
The compilation contains information about the electromagnetic scattering by spherical particles, relevant links, and applications.

=== Codes for electromagnetic scattering by a single homogeneous sphere ===
Year	Name	Authors	References	Language	Short Description
1983	BHMIE	Craig F. Bohren and Donald R. Huffman		Fortran IDLMatlab C Python	"Mie solutions" (infinite series) to scattering, absorption and phase function of electromagnetic waves by a homogeneous sphere.
2002	MiePlot	Philip Laven		Visual Basic	MiePlot offers the following mathematical models for the scattering of light by a sphere: Mie solutions, Debye series, ray tracing (based on geometrical optics), ray tracing including the effects of interference between rays, Airy theory, Rayleigh scattering, diffraction, surface waves. In addition to single-wavelength calculations, MiePlot can also perform calculations for some wavelengths, thus approximating a continuous spectrum (such as sunlight) to produce simulations of atmospheric optical effects such as rainbows, coronas and glories.
2003	Mie_Single etc.	Gareth Thomas and Don Grainger		IDL	The Sub-Department of Atmospheric Oceanic and Planetary Physics in the University of Oxford maintains an archive of Mie scattering routines for both single spheres and populations of particles in which sizes follow a log-normal distribution. The code is also available for calculating the analytical derivatives of Mie scattering (i.e. the derivative of the extinction and scattering coefficients, and the intensity functions with respect to size parameter and complex refractive index). The routines are written in IDL, but a Fortran-based DLM version (which substantially reduces runtime) of the single-sphere code is also available.
2026	miepython	Scott Prahl		Python	Pure-Python implementation of Mie scattering by homogeneous spheres, including scattering, absorption and extinction efficiencies, angular scattering, Mie coefficients, and near-field electric and magnetic fields.

=== Codes for electromagnetic scattering by a layered sphere ===
Algorithmic literature includes several contributions

Year	Name	Authors	Ref	Language	License	Short Description
1981	DMILAY	Owen B. Toon and T. P. Ackerman		Fortran	No license specified but open source (public domain)	Scattering by a stratified sphere (a particle with a spherical core surrounded by a spherical shell). Code dates from 1968 available here:
1983	BHCOAT	Craig F. Bohren and Donald R. Huffman		Fortran	No specified but open source (public domain via)	"Mie solutions" (infinite series) to scattering, absorption and phase function of electromagnetic waves by a homogeneous concentring shells.
1997	BART	A. Quirantes		Fortran	Open source (own license)	Based on the Aden–Kerker theory to calculate light-scattering properties for coated spherical particles
2004	MjcLscCoatSph	M. Jonasz		GUI/Windows	Proprietary / closed source	This program calculates the scattering, absorption, and attenuation parameters, as well as the angular scattering patterns of a single coated sphere according to Aden-Kerker theory.
2007		L. Liu, H. Wang, B. Yu, Y. Xu, J. Shen		C	Unknown	Light scattering by a coated sphere (extinction efficiency, scattering efficiency, light scattering intensity)
2009-2022	Scattnlay	O. Pena, U. Pal, K. Ladutenko		C++, Python, and JavaScript	GPLv3	Light scattering from a multilayered sphere based on the algorithm by W Yang. Very robust and stable, slower than Toon and Ackerman. Evaluate integral parameters and angular patterns, near-field and power flow streamlines plotting. Has a compilation option to use Boost.Multiprecision for higher accuracy. Web application is the part of package, available online on the website of Department of Physics and Engineering in ITMO University.
2023	PyMieSim	Martin Poinsinet de Sivry-Houle, Nicolas Godbout, Caroline Boudoux		Python / C++	MIT License	Lorenz–Mie scattering simulations for homogeneous and two-layer spheres, including efficiencies, cross sections, angular scattering and detector coupling.
2026	PyMieDiff	Oscar K. C. Jackson, Simone De Liberato, Otto L. Muskens, Peter R. Wiecha		Python / PyTorch	GPLv3	Differentiable Mie scattering toolkit for multilayer spherical particles. Supports scattering, absorption and extinction cross sections, angular scattering and near fields, with automatic differentiation, vectorized calculations and GPU acceleration.

=== Codes for electromagnetic scattering by cluster of spheres ===
Year	Name	Authors	References	Language	Short Description
1998-2003	GMM	Yu-lin Xu and Bo A. S. Gustafson		Fortran	Codes which calculate exactly electromagnetic scattering by an aggregate of spheres in a single orientation or at an average over individual orientations.
2013	MSTM	D. W. Mackowski		Fortran	Codes which calculate exactly electromagnetic scattering by an aggregate of spheres and spheres within spheres for complex materials. Works in parallel as well.
2015	py_gmm	G. Pellegrini		Python + Fortran	A Python + Fortran 90 implementation of the Generalized Multiparticle Mie method, especially suited for plasmonics and near field computation.
2017	CELES	A. Egel, L. Pattelli and G. Mazzamuto		MATLAB + CUDA	Running on NVIDIA GPUs, with high performance for many spheres.
2020	QPMS	M. Nečada		C, Python	Many-particle simulations in homogeneous media, supports various particle shapes in finite as well as infinite periodic configurations.
2021	SMUTHI	A. Egel et al.		Python + Fortran + CUDA	Many spheres in stratified media, other particle shapes are available.
2024	treams	Dominik Beutel, Ivan Fernandez-Corbaton, Carsten Rockstuhl		Python, Cython	T-matrix multiple-scattering calculations for finite clusters of spheres, multilayered spheres, and other particles; periodic arrangements are also supported.

== Relevant scattering codes ==
- Discrete dipole approximation codes
- Codes for electromagnetic scattering by cylinders

== See also ==
- Computational electromagnetics
- Light scattering by particles
- List of atmospheric radiative transfer codes
- Optical properties of water and ice
- Mie theory
