= Daniele Amati =

Italian physicist (1931–2026)

Daniele Amati (11 August 1931 – 4 August 2026) was an Italian theoretical physicist, specialising in particle physics.

== Life and career ==
Amati was born in Rome on 11 August 1931. In 1952 he received, from the University of Buenos Aires, his Ph.D. in physics under Richard Gans with a thesis on ferroresonant circuits. In 1953–1954 Amati was a fellow at the Centro Brasileiro de Pesquisas Físicas in California, where he took several graduate courses, including one taught by Richard Feynman. From 1954 to 1959 Amati was an assistant at the University of Rome. Afterwards he was in the theory department of CERN and from 1973 to 1975 its director. Since 1986 he has been a professor at and, until 2001, director of the Scuola Internazionale Superiore di Studi Avanzati (SISSA). SISSA not only deals with physics but also with cognitive science and biology and is close to the International Center for Theoretical Physics (ICTP) located near Trieste. Under the auspices of SISSA, Springer Nature publishes the purely electronic Journal of High Energy Physics, founded by Amati in 1997. In the early to mid-1970s, Amati made the theory group at CERN a center of early string theory development, which was initiated as a result of a dual-resonance model by Gabriele Veneziano at CERN in 1968. Among CERN's theory group, Victor Alessandrini in 1971 and Claud Lovelace in 1970 published on the multiloop amplitudes of the bosonic string. Amati's 1989 article with Ciafaloni and Veneziano has over 1000 citations.

Back in the early 1970s, Italian physicist Daniele Amati, characterized string theory as "part of 21st-century physics that fell by chance into the 20th-century." He meant that string theory had been invented by a process of tinkering, without physicists really grasping what was behind it. Amati surmised that a true understanding of the foundations of this remarkably rich theory would have to await the 21st century.

Amati died in Trieste on 4 August 2026, at the age of 94.

== Selected publications ==
- as editor with John Ellis: Quantum Reflections , Cambridge University Press, New York 2000, ISBN 0-521630088.
