= HRS Computing =

- HRS Computing's icon
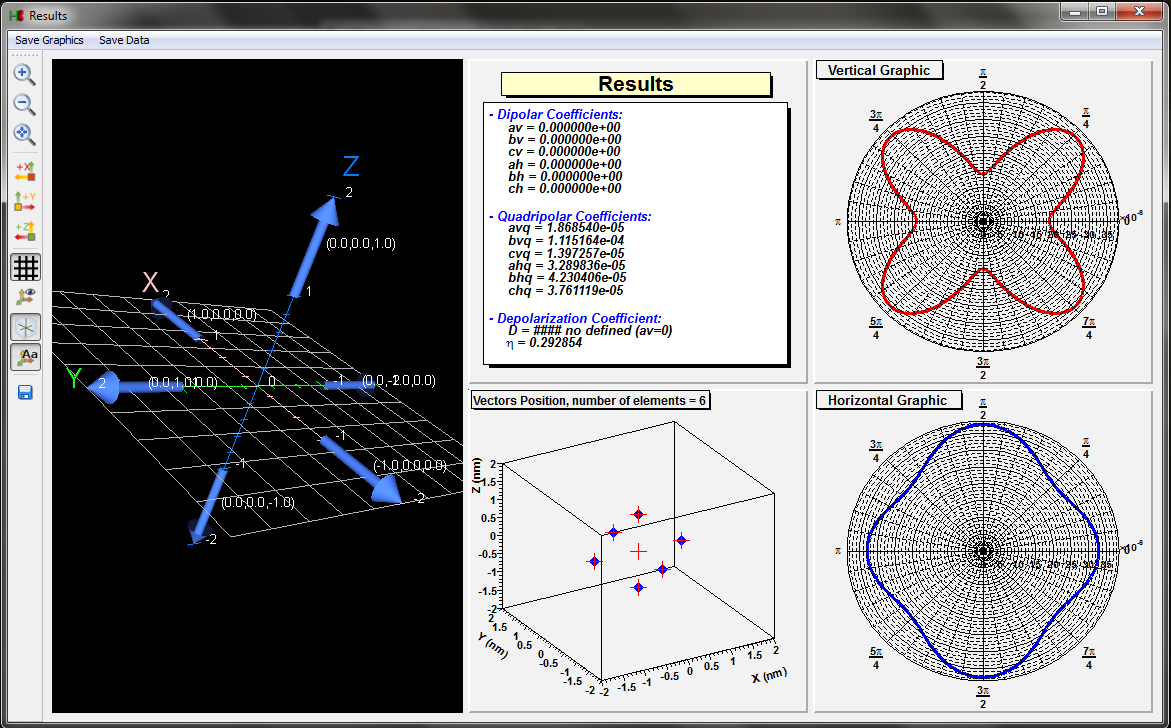
- A screenshot of HRS Computing 2.0.0
- Original author(s): S. Carrazza, J. Duboisset
- Initial release: December 2008
- Stable release: 2.0.0 / December 2010
- Written in: C++
- Operating system: 32-bit & 64-bit Windows; Linux; Mac OS; FreeBSD
- Platform: Cross-platform
- Available in: English, French, Italian, Spanish, Portuguese
- Type: Physics simulation
- License: GNU General Public License
- Website: hrscomputing.sf.net

HRS Computing is an open-source scientific software which simulates the hyper Rayleigh scattering (HRS) in nonlinear optics. The software is designed for researchers, and it is used to verify the agreement between theoretical models and experimental data.

== Main features ==
From the physics point of view the software provides coefficients that are useful for the determination of the microscopic structure of composites, molecules, etc.

- the dipolar and quadripolar coefficients
- the depolarization factor

Using these coefficients, the software also provides:

- the visualization of simulated polar graphics generated by HRS
- molecular position and dipolar momentum in 3D
- easy data and graphics export
