= Hendrik C. van de Hulst =

Dutch astronomer and mathematician

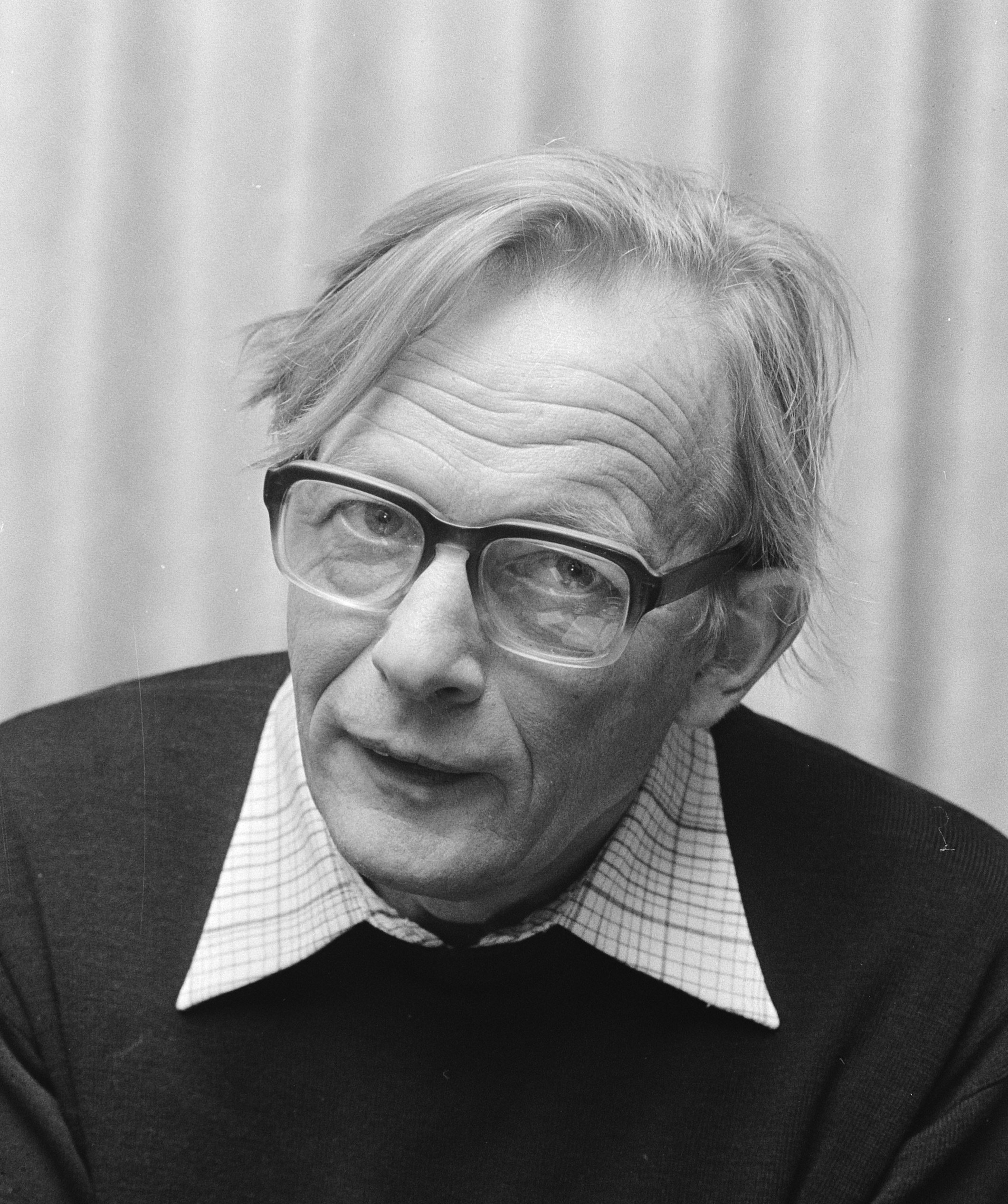
- Hendrik C. van de Hulst in 1977
- Born: 19 November 1918; Utrecht, the Netherlands
- Died: 31 July 2000 (aged 81); Leiden, the Netherlands
- Known for: 21 cm hyperfine line Anomalous diffraction theory
- Awards: Henry Draper Medal (1955); Eddington Medal (1955); Rumford Medal (1964); Bruce Medal (1978); Karl Schwarzschild Medal (1995)
- Scientific career
- Fields: Astronomy
- Workplaces: University of Leiden
- Thesis: Optics of spherical particles (1946)
- Doctoral advisor: Marcel Minnaert
- Doctoral students: 26, including Johan Bleeker, Elly Dekker, Harm Habing, Vincent Icke, Alexander Ollongren, Tim de Zeeuw

Hendrik Christoffel "Henk" van de Hulst (19 November 1918 – 31 July 2000) was a Dutch astronomer.

In 1944, while a student in Utrecht, he predicted the existence of the 21 cm hyperfine line of neutral interstellar hydrogen. After this line was discovered, he participated, with Jan Oort and Lex Muller, in the effort to use radio astronomy to map out the neutral hydrogen in our galaxy, which first revealed its spiral structure. Motivated by the scattering in cosmic dust, Van de Hulst studied light scattering by spherical particles and wrote his doctoral thesis on the topic, subsequently formulating the anomalous diffraction theory.

He spent most of his career at Leiden University, retiring in 1984. He published widely in astronomy, and dealt with the solar corona, and interstellar clouds. After 1960 he was a leader in international space research projects.

In 1956 he became member of the Royal Netherlands Academy of Arts and Sciences.

== Books ==
- van de Hulst, H.C., Light Scattering by Small Particles, New York, (Wiley, 1957; Dover, 1981), ISBN 0-486-64228-3.
- van de Hulst, H.C., Multiple Light Scattering, New York, Academic Press, 1980, ISBN 978-0-12-710701-1.

== Honors ==
Awards

- Henry Draper Medal of the National Academy of Sciences (1955)
- Eddington Medal of the Royal Astronomical Society (1955)
- Rumford Medal of the Royal Society (1964)
- Bruce Medal of the Astronomical Society of the Pacific (1978)
- Karl Schwarzschild Medal of the Astronomische Gesellschaft (1995)

Named after him

- Asteroid 2413 van de Hulst
- van de Hulst approximation

=== Honors ===
- elected to the American Philosophical Society (1960)
- elected to the American Academy of Arts and Sciences (1960)
- elected to the United States National Academy of Sciences (1977)

== See also ==
- List of textbooks in electromagnetism

== Bibliography ==
- Tenn, Joe. "Hendrik Christoffel van de Hulst". Sonoma State University.
