= Richard Gans =

Physicist (1880–1954)

Richard Martin Gans
- Born: March 7, 1880; Hamburg, German Empire
- Died: June 27, 1954 (aged 74)
- Education: University of Strasbourg
- Known for: Gans theory, Rayleigh–Gans approximation
- Scientific career
- Fields: Physics
- Workplaces: National University of La Plata, University of Buenos Aires
- Doctoral advisor: Karl Ferdinand Braun

Richard Gans' grave in La Plata, Argentina

Richard Martin Gans (7 March 1880 – 27 June 1954), German of Jewish origin, born in Hamburg, was the physicist who founded the Physics Institute of the National University of La Plata, Argentina. He was its Director in two different periods.

During the first one, starting in 1911, he continued the work started by Emil Bose raising the research level of the institute to international renown. In 1914 he founded the publication of a scientific journal: Contribución al estudio de las ciencias fisicomatemáticas, with two series: matematicofísica and técnica.

His second period in La Plata was from the late 1940s through the early 1950s, when he played an important role as member of one of the commissions which reviewed Ronald Richter's claims related to the Huemul Project.

After leaving La Plata in 1951 he taught theoretical and advanced physics at the University of Buenos Aires.

Gans theory is named after Richard Gans. This theory gives the solutions to the Maxwell equations for prolate and oblate spheroidal particles. It is an extension of Mie theory and thus sometimes called Mie-Gans theory. He first published these equations describing the scattering of elongated particles in 1912 for gold particles. In 1915, the solution for silver particles was published. Gans also rederived Lord Rayleigh scattering approximation for optically soft spheres, which is now known as Rayleigh–Gans approximation.

His doctoral students include Daniele Amati and Alberto Sirlin.

== Studies ==
Gans graduated in 1901, summa cum laude, with the title of Dr.Phil.Nat. at the University of Strasbourg. His doctoral advisor was Karl Ferdinand Braun.

== Research and teaching ==
=== Academic timeline ===
- 1901–02 University of Heidelberg
- 1903–11 University of Tübingen
- 1911–12 University of Strasbourg
- 1912–25 Universidad de La Plata
- 1925–35 University of Königsberg

– Interrupted: 3rd Reich, World War II, postwar –

- 1947–51 Universidad de La Plata
- 1951–53 Universidad de Buenos Aires

=== Publications ===
Gans published extensively in Annalen der Physik .
