= Emil Bose =

German physicist

Emil Hermann Bose (October 20, 1874 in Bremen, Germany – May 25, 1911 in La Plata, Argentina), was a German physicist. He was the first director of the Department of Electrical Engineering at the University of La Plata, Argentina. He studied under Walther Nernst at the University of Göttingen, Germany and was recruited by the newly created university in Argentina, where he taught for two years until his death from typhoid fever in 1911. He was succeeded by Richard Gans.
See Bibiloni, A.G. (2005)
