= Codes for electromagnetic scattering by cylinders =

Codes for electromagnetic scattering by cylinders – this article list codes for electromagnetic scattering by a cylinder.

Majority of existing codes for calculation of electromagnetic scattering by a single cylinder are based on Mie theory, which is an analytical solution of Maxwell's equations in terms of infinite series.

== Classification ==
The compilation contains information about the electromagnetic scattering by cylindrical particles, relevant links, and applications.

=== Codes for electromagnetic scattering by a single homogeneous cylinder ===
Year	Name	Authors	References	Language	Short description
1983	BHCYL	Craig F. Bohren and Donald R. Huffman		Fortran	Mie solution (infinite series) to scattering, absorption and phase function of electromagnetic waves by a homogeneous cylinder.
1992	SCAOBLIQ2.FOR	H. A. Yousif and E. Boutros		Fortran	Cylinder, oblique incidence.
2002	Mackowski	D. Mackowski		Fortran	Cylinder, oblique incidence.
2008	jMie2D	Jeffrey M. McMahon		C++	Mie solution. Open-source software.
2015	nwabsorption	Sarath Ramadurgam		MATLAB	Computes various optical properties of a single nanowire with up to 2 shell layers using Mie-formalism.
2017	TMATROM	M. Ganesh and Stuart C. Hawkins		MATLAB	Numerically stable T-matrix code for cylinders (including with noncircular cross sections).
2020	MieSolver	Stuart C. Hawkins		MATLAB	One or more cylinders with mixed properties including solid and layered cylinders.
2024	treams	Dominik Beutel, Ivan Fernandez-Corbaton, Carsten Rockstuhl		Python, Cython	T-matrix method for electromagnetic scattering by homogeneous and multilayered infinitely long cylinders; supports cylindrical-wave expansions and finite and periodic arrangements.

== Relevant scattering codes ==
- Discrete dipole approximation codes
- Codes for electromagnetic scattering by spheres

== See also ==
- Computational electromagnetics
- List of atmospheric radiative transfer codes
