= Rayleigh scattering =

Light scattering by small particles

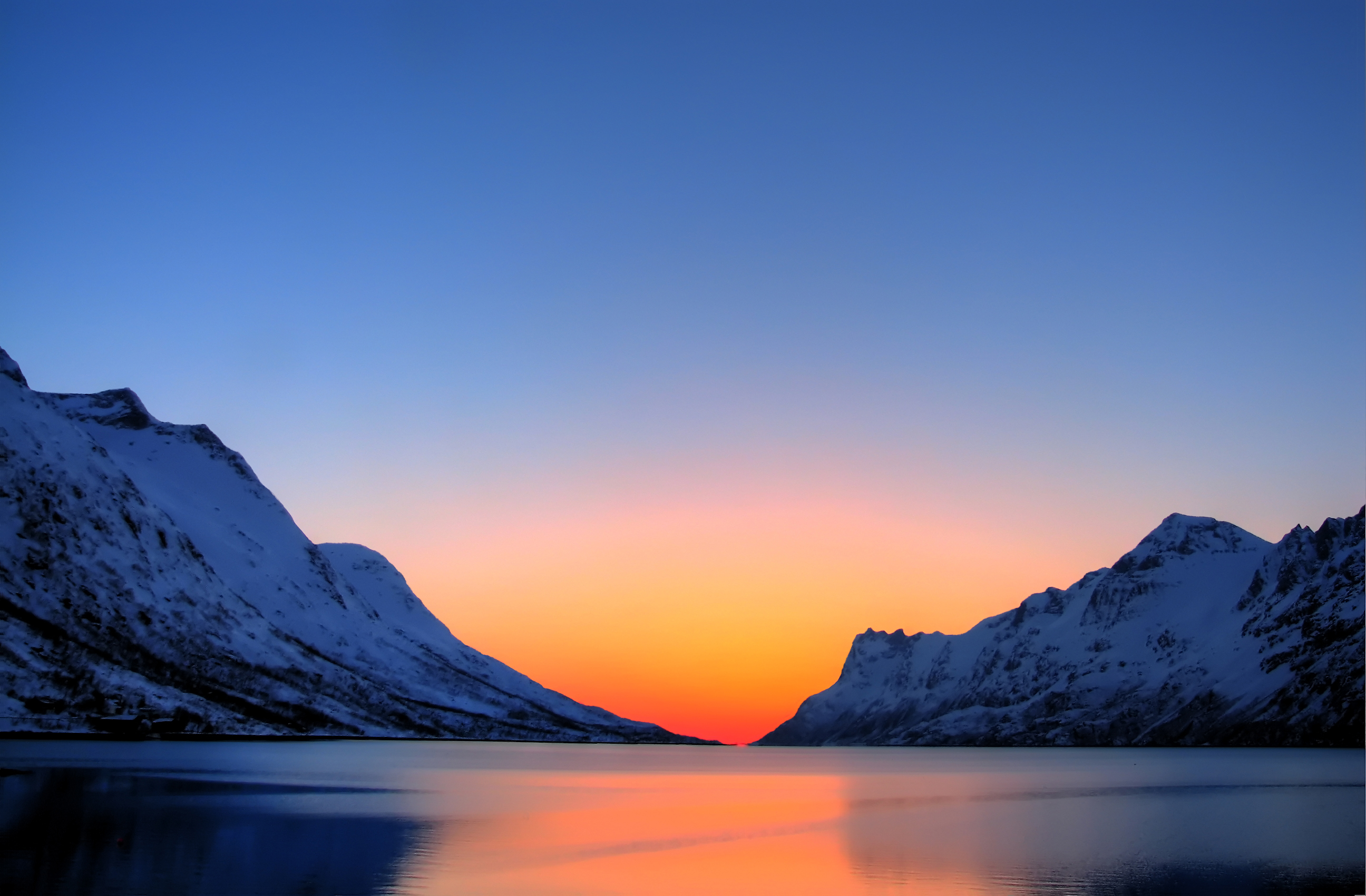
Rayleigh scattering causes the blue color of the sky at large angles to the direction of solar rays and yellow or orange colors for light from the direction of the Sun.

Rayleigh scattering (/ˈreɪli/ RAY-lee) is the scattering or deflection of light, or other electromagnetic radiation, by particles with a size much smaller than the wavelength of the radiation. For light frequencies well below the resonance frequency of the scattering medium (normal dispersion regime), the amount of scattering is inversely proportional to the fourth power of the wavelength (e.g., a blue color is scattered much more than a red color as light propagates through air). The phenomenon is named after the 19th-century British physicist Lord Rayleigh (John William Strutt).

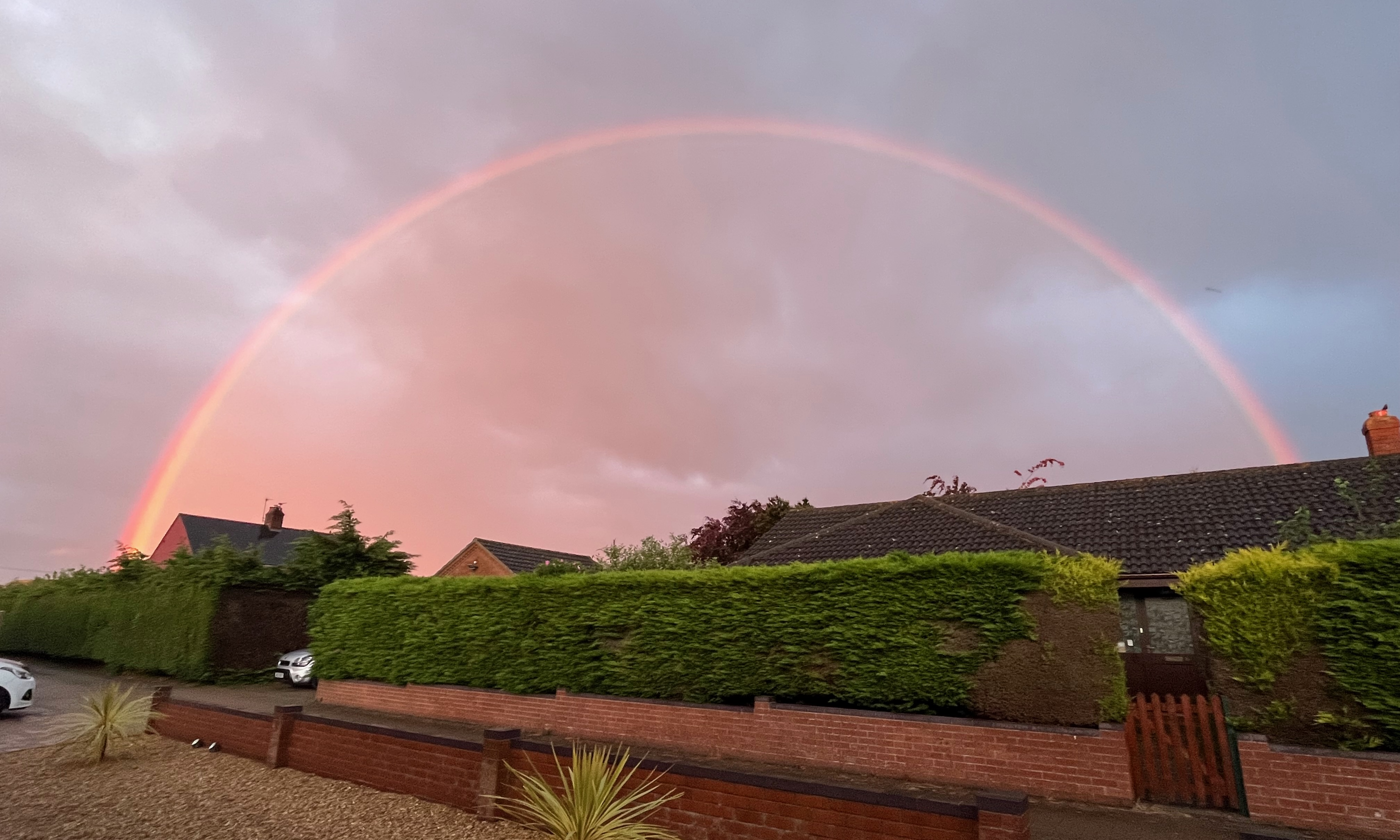
Due to Rayleigh scattering, red and orange colors are more visible during sunset because the blue and violet light has been scattered out of the direct path. This can yield dramatically colored skies and monochromatic rainbows.

Rayleigh scattering results from the electric polarizability of the particles. The oscillating electric field of a light wave acts on the charges within a particle, causing them to move at the same frequency. The particle, therefore, becomes a small radiating dipole whose radiation we see as scattered light. The particles may be individual atoms or molecules; it can occur when light travels through transparent solids and liquids, but is most prominently seen in gases.

Rayleigh scattering of sunlight in Earth's atmosphere causes diffuse sky radiation. Since blue light wavelengths scatter more, the diffuse sky seen in daytime is blue. At twilight the sunlight on the horizon is missing the scattered blue light wavelengths giving a yellowish to reddish hue to the low Sun.

Scattering by particles with a size comparable to, or larger than, the wavelength of the light is typically treated by the Mie theory, the discrete dipole approximation and other computational techniques. Rayleigh scattering applies to particles that are small with respect to wavelengths of light, and that are optically "soft" (i.e., with a refractive index close to 1). Anomalous diffraction theory applies to optically soft but larger particles.

== History ==
In c. 1506–1510, Leonardo da Vinci conjectured that the scattering of sunlight by small particles in the atmosphere gave the sky its blue hue, and analysis of his paintings suggest that he understood the influence of particle size on the scattering of light.

In 1869, while attempting to determine whether any contaminants remained in the purified air he used for infrared experiments, John Tyndall discovered that bright light scattering off nanoscopic particulates was faintly blue-tinted. While he proposed that this phenomenon explained the blueness of the sky, he could not explain the preference for blue light, nor could atmospheric dust explain the intensity of the sky's color.

In 1871, Lord Rayleigh published two papers on the color and polarization of skylight to quantify Tyndall's effect in water droplets in terms of the tiny particulates' volumes and refractive indices. In 1881, with the benefit of James Clerk Maxwell's 1865 proof of the electromagnetic nature of light, he showed that his equations followed from electromagnetism. In 1899, he showed that they applied to individual molecules, with terms containing particulate volumes and refractive indices replaced with terms for molecular polarizability. It was this paper that established the basic scientific model for the color of the sky.

== Small size parameter approximation ==
The size of a scattering particle is often parameterized by the ratio

$$x = \frac{2 \pi r} {\lambda}$$

where r is the particle's radius, λ is the wavelength of the light and x is a dimensionless parameter that characterizes the particle's interaction with the incident radiation such that: Objects with x ≫ 1 act as geometric shapes, scattering light according to their projected area. At the intermediate x ≃ 1 of Mie scattering, interference effects develop through phase variations over the object's surface. Rayleigh scattering applies to the case when the scattering particle is very small (x ≪ 1, with a particle size < 1/10 of wavelength) and the whole surface re-radiates with the same phase. Because the particles are randomly positioned, the scattered light arrives at a particular point with a random collection of phases; it is incoherent and the resulting intensity is just the sum of the squares of the amplitudes from each particle and therefore proportional to the inverse fourth power of the wavelength and the sixth power of its size. The wavelength dependence is characteristic of dipole scattering and the volume dependence will apply to any scattering mechanism. In detail, the intensity of light scattered by any one of the small spheres of radius r and refractive index n from a beam of unpolarized light of wavelength λ and intensity I_{0} is given by
$$I_s = I_0 \frac{ 1+\cos^2 \theta }{2 R^2} \left( \frac{ 2 \pi }{ \lambda } \right)^4 \left( \frac{ n^2-1}{ n^2+2 } \right)^2 r^6$$
where R is the observer's distance to the particle and θ is the scattering angle. Averaging this over all angles gives the Rayleigh scattering cross-section of the particles in air:
$$\sigma_\text{s} = \frac{ 8 \pi}{3}  \left( \frac{2\pi}{\lambda}\right)^4 \left( \frac{ n^2-1}{ n^2+2 } \right)^2 r^6 .$$
Here n is the refractive index of the spheres that approximate the molecules of the gas; the index of the gas surrounding the spheres is neglected, an approximation that introduces an error of less than 0.05%.

The major constituent of the atmosphere, nitrogen, has Rayleigh cross section of 5.1×10^{−31} m^{2} at a wavelength of 532 nm (green light). Over the length of one meter the fraction of light scattered can be approximated from the product of the cross-section and the particle density, that is number of particles per unit volume. For air at atmospheric pressure there are about 2×10^{25} molecules per cubic meter, and the fraction scattered will be 10^{−5} for every meter of travel.

== From molecules ==
Figure showing the greater proportion of blue light scattered by the atmosphere relative to red light

The expression above can also be written in terms of individual molecules by expressing the dependence on refractive index in terms of the molecular polarizability α, proportional to the dipole moment induced by the electric field of the light. In this case, the Rayleigh scattering intensity for a single particle is given in CGS-units by
$$I_s = I_0 \frac{8\pi^4\alpha^2}{\lambda^4 R^2}(1+\cos^2\theta)$$
and in SI-units by
$$I_s = I_0 \frac{\pi^2\alpha^2}{{\varepsilon_0}^2 \lambda^4 R^2}\frac{1+\cos^2\theta}{2} .$$

== Effect of fluctuations ==
When the dielectric constant $\epsilon$ of a certain region of volume $V$ is different from the average dielectric constant of the medium $\bar{\epsilon}$, then any incident light will be scattered according to the following equation

$$I=I_0\frac{\pi^2V^2\sigma_\epsilon^2}{2\lambda^4R^2} {\left (1+\cos^2\theta\right )}$$
where $\sigma_\epsilon^2$ represents the variance of the fluctuation in the dielectric constant $\epsilon$.

== Cause of the blue color of the sky ==
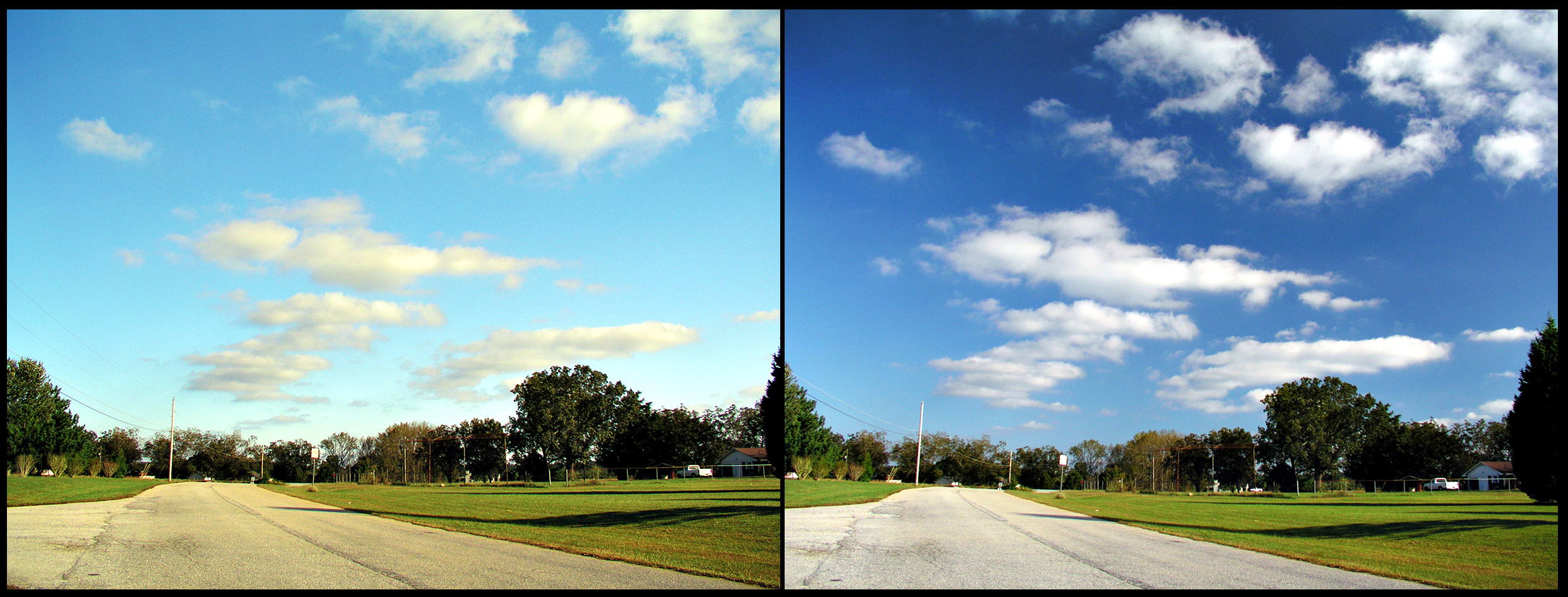
Scattered blue light is polarized. The picture on the right is shot through a polarizing filter: the polarizer transmits light that is linearly polarized in a specific direction.

The blue color of the sky is a consequence of three factors:

- the blackbody spectrum of sunlight coming into the Earth's atmosphere,
- Rayleigh scattering of that light off oxygen and nitrogen molecules, and
- the response of the human visual system.

The strong wavelength dependence of the Rayleigh scattering (~λ^{−4}) means that shorter (blue) wavelengths are scattered more strongly than longer (red) wavelengths. This results in the indirect blue and violet light coming from all regions of the sky. Although violet light is scattered more than blue light, the daytime sky is perceived as blue because human vision is less sensitive to violet wavelengths and sunlight contains less violet than blue light. The human eye responds to this wavelength combination as if it were a combination of blue and white light.

Some of the scattering can also be from sulfate particles. For years after large Plinian eruptions, the blue cast of the sky is notably brightened by the persistent sulfate load of the stratospheric gases. Some works of the artist J. M. W. Turner may owe their vivid red colours to the eruption of Mount Tambora in his lifetime.

In locations with little light pollution, the moonlit night sky is also blue, because moonlight is reflected sunlight, with a slightly lower color temperature due to the brownish color of the Moon. The moonlit sky is not perceived as blue, however, because at low light levels human vision comes mainly from rod cells that do not produce any color perception (Purkinje effect).

== Of sound in amorphous solids ==
Rayleigh scattering is also an important mechanism of wave scattering in amorphous solids such as glass, and is responsible for acoustic wave damping and phonon damping in glasses and granular matter at low or not too high temperatures. This is because in glasses at higher temperatures the Rayleigh-type scattering regime is obscured by the anharmonic damping (typically with a ~λ^{−2} dependence on wavelength), which becomes increasingly more important as the temperature rises.

== In amorphous solids – glasses – optical fibers ==
Rayleigh scattering is an important component of the scattering of optical signals in optical fibers. Silica fibers are glasses, disordered materials with microscopic variations of density and refractive index. These give rise to energy losses due to the scattered light, with the following coefficient:
$$\alpha_\text{scat} = \frac{8 \pi^3}{3 \lambda^4} n^8 p^2 k T_\text{f} \beta$$

where n is the refraction index, p is the photoelastic coefficient of the glass, k is the Boltzmann constant, and β is the isothermal compressibility. T_{f} is a fictive temperature, representing the temperature at which the density fluctuations are "frozen" in the material.

== In porous materials ==
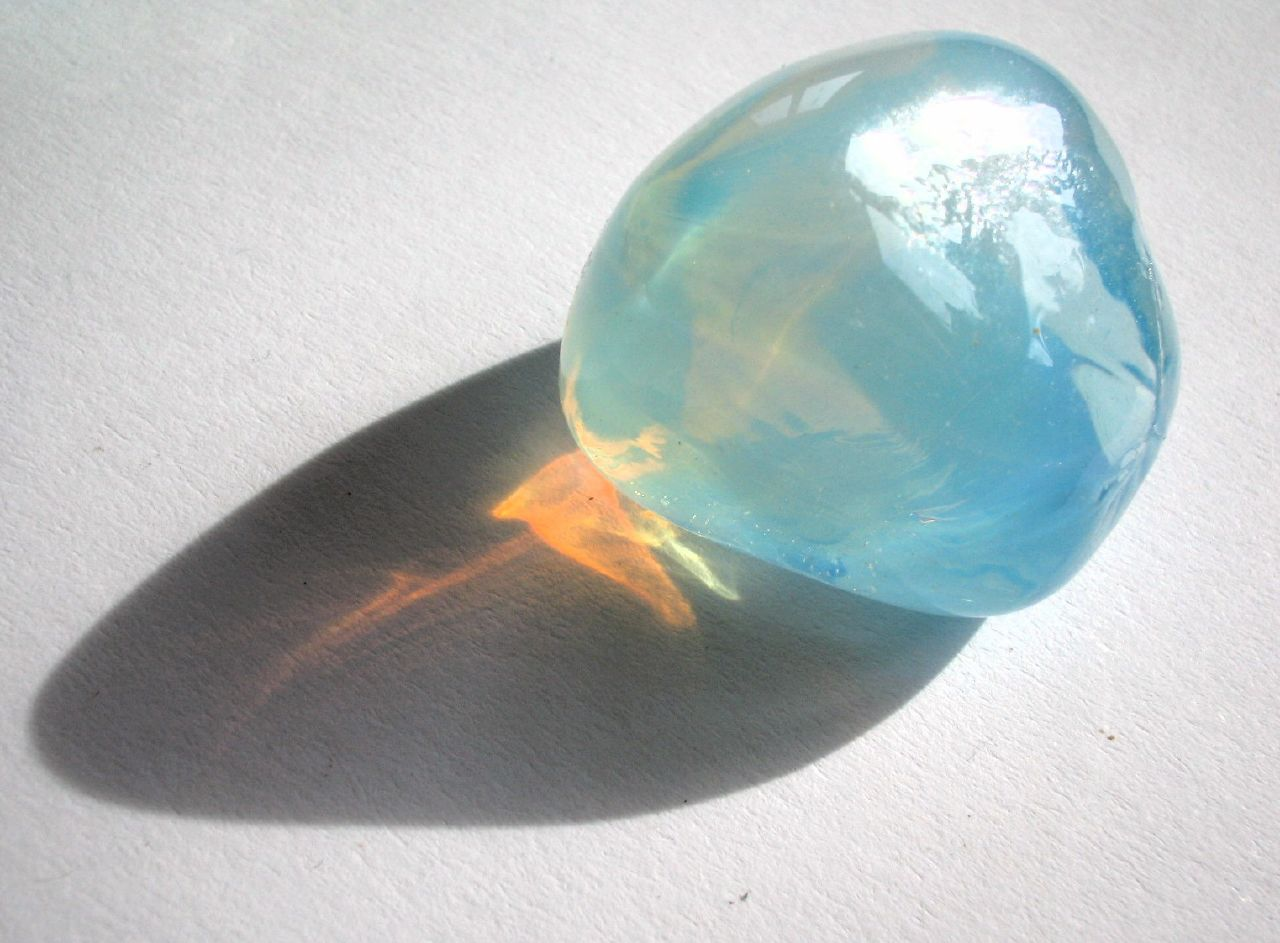
Rayleigh scattering in opalescent glass: it appears blue from the side, but orange light shines through.

Rayleigh-type λ^{−4} scattering can also be exhibited by porous materials. An example is the strong optical scattering by nanoporous materials. The strong contrast in refractive index between pores and solid parts of sintered alumina results in very strong scattering, with light completely changing direction each five micrometers on average. The λ^{−4}-type scattering is caused by the nanoporous structure (a narrow pore size distribution around ~70 nm) obtained by sintering monodispersive alumina powder.

== See also ==
- Rayleigh sky model – Polarization pattern of the daytime sky
- Rician fading – Radio signal statistical model
- Optical phenomena – Observable events that result from the interaction of light and matter
- Dynamic light scattering – Technique for determining size distribution of particles
- Raman scattering – Inelastic scattering of photons by matter
- Rayleigh–Gans approximation
- Tyndall effect – Scattering of light by tiny particles in a colloidal suspension
- Critical opalescence – Increase in photonic scattering during a phase transition
- HRS Computing – scientific simulation software
- Marian Smoluchowski – Polish physicist (1872–1917)
- Rayleigh criterion – Ability of any image-forming device to distinguish small details of an object
- Aerial perspective – Atmospheric effects on the appearance of a distant object
- Parametric process – Interacting phenomenon between light and matter
- Bragg's law – Scattering from arrays of atoms

== Works ==
- Strutt, J.W (1871). "XV. On the light from the sky, its polarization and colour". The London, Edinburgh, and Dublin Philosophical Magazine and Journal of Science. 41 (271): 107–120. doi:10.1080/14786447108640452.
- Strutt, J.W (1871). "XXXVI. On the light from the sky, its polarization and colour". The London, Edinburgh, and Dublin Philosophical Magazine and Journal of Science. 41 (273): 274–279. doi:10.1080/14786447108640479.
- Strutt, J.W (1871). "LVIII. On the scattering of light by small particles". The London, Edinburgh, and Dublin Philosophical Magazine and Journal of Science. 41 (275): 447–454. Bibcode:1871LEDPM..41..447S. doi:10.1080/14786447108640507.
- Rayleigh, Lord (1881). "X. On the electromagnetic theory of light". The London, Edinburgh, and Dublin Philosophical Magazine and Journal of Science. 12 (73): 81–101. Bibcode:1881LEDPM..12...81R. doi:10.1080/14786448108627074.
- Rayleigh, Lord (1899). "XXXIV. On the transmission of light through an atmosphere containing small particles in suspension, and on the origin of the blue of the sky". The London, Edinburgh, and Dublin Philosophical Magazine and Journal of Science. 47 (287): 375–384. Bibcode:1899LEDPM..47..375R. doi:10.1080/14786449908621276.
