= Discrete dipole approximation codes =

Software packages using DDA

This is a list of software packages for calculating scattering and absorption of light using Discrete dipole approximation (DDA).

Most of the software applies to arbitrary-shaped inhomogeneous nonmagnetic particles and particle systems in free space or homogeneous dielectric host medium. The calculated quantities typically include the Mueller matrices, integral cross-sections (extinction, absorption, and scattering), internal fields and angle-resolved scattered fields (phase function). There are some published comparisons of existing DDA codes.

== General-purpose open-source software ==
These packages typically use regular grids (cubical or rectangular cuboid), conjugate gradient method to solve large systems of linear equations and FFT-acceleration of the matrix-vector products which uses convolution theorem. Complexity of this approach is almost linear in number of dipoles for both time and memory.

Name	Authors	References	Language	Updated	Features
DDSCAT	Draine and Flatau		Fortran	2019 (v. 7.3.3)	Can also handle periodic particles and efficiently calculate near fields. Uses OpenMP acceleration.
DDscat.C++	Choliy		C++	2017 (v. 7.3.1)	Version of DDSCAT translated to C++ with some further improvements.
ADDA	Yurkin, Hoekstra, and contributors		C	2020 (v. 1.4.0)	Implements fast and rigorous consideration of a plane substrate, and allows rectangular-cuboid voxels for highly oblate or prolate particles. Can also calculate emission (decay-rate) enhancement of point emitters. Also simulates electron-energy-loss spectroscopy and cathodoluminescence in arbitrary (including absorbing) host media. Near-fields calculation is not very efficient. Uses Message Passing Interface (MPI) parallelization and can run on GPU (OpenCL).
OpenDDA	McDonald		C	2009 (v. 0.4.1)	Uses both OpenMP and MPI parallelization. Focuses on computational efficiency.
DDA-GPU	Kieß		C++	2016	Runs on GPU (OpenCL). Algorithms are partly based on ADDA.
VIE-FFT	Sha		C/C++	2019	Also calculates near fields and material absorption. Named differently, but the algorithms are very similar to the ones used in the mainstream DDA.
VoxScatter	Groth, Polimeridis, and White		Matlab	2019	Uses circulant preconditioner for accelerating iterative solvers
IFDDA	Chaumet, Sentenac, and Sentenac		Fortran, GUI in C++ with Qt	2025 (v. 1.0.27)	Idiot friendly DDA. Uses OpenMP, HDF5 and CUDA for GPU. Has a separate version (IF-DDAM) for multi-layered substrate.
MPDDA	Shabaninezhad, Awan, and Ramakrishna		Matlab	2021 (v. 1.0)	Runs on GPU (using Matlab capabilities)
CPDDA	Dibo Xu and others		Python	2025	GPU acceleration using CuPy

== Specialized software ==
These list include software that do not qualify for the previous section. The reasons may include the following: source code is not available, FFT acceleration is absent or reduced, the code focuses on specific applications not allowing easy calculation of standard scattering quantities.

Name	Authors	References	Language	Updated	Features
DDSURF, DDSUB, DDFILM	Schmehl, Nebeker, and Zhang		Fortran	2008	Rigorous handling of semi-infinite substrate and finite films (with arbitrary particle placement), but only 2D FFT acceleration is used.
DDMM	Mackowski		Fortran	2002	Calculates T-matrix, which can then be used to efficiently calculate orientation-averaged scattering properties.
CDA	McMahon		Matlab	2006	
DDA-SI	Loke		Matlab	2014 (v. 0.2)	Rigorous handling of substrate, but no FFT acceleration is used.
PyDDA	Dmitriev		Python	2015	Reimplementation of DDA-SI
e-DDA	Vaschillo and Bigelow		Fortran	2019 (v. 2.0)	Simulates electron-energy loss spectroscopy and cathodoluminescence. Built upon DDSCAT 7.1.
DDEELS	Geuquet, Guillaume and Henrard		Fortran	2013 (v. 2.1)	Simulates electron-energy loss spectroscopy and cathodoluminescence. Handles substrate through image approximation, but no FFT acceleration is used.
T-DDA	Edalatpour		Fortran	2015	Simulates near-field radiative heat transfer. The computational bottleneck is direct matrix inversion (no FFT acceleration is used). Uses OpenMP and MPI parallelization.
CDDA	Rosales, Albella, González, Gutiérrez, and Moreno			2021	Applies to chiral systems (solves coupled equations for electric and magnetic fields)
PyDScat	Yibin Jiang, Abhishek Sharma and Leroy Cronin		Python	2023	Simulates nanostructures undergoing structural transformation with GPU acceleration.

== See also ==
- Computational electromagnetics
- Mie theory
- Finite-difference time-domain method
- Method of moments (electromagnetics)
