= Anomalous diffraction theory =

Anomalous diffraction theory (also van de Hulst approximation, eikonal approximation, high energy approximation, soft particle approximation) is an approximation developed by Dutch astronomer van de Hulst describing light scattering for optically soft spheres.

The anomalous diffraction approximation for extinction efficiency is valid for optically soft particles and large size parameter, x = 2πa/λ:

$$Q_{ext} = 2 - \frac{4}{p} \sin{p} + \frac{4}{p^2} (1-\cos{p})$$,

where $Q_{ext}=Q_{abs}+Q_{sca}=Q_{sca}$ in this derivation since the refractive index is assumed to be real, and thus there is no absorption ($Q_{abs}=0$). $Q_{ext}$ is the efficiency factor of extinction, which is defined as the ratio of the extinction cross section and geometrical cross section πa^{2}.
p = 4πa(n – 1)/λ has a physical meaning of the phase delay of the wave passing through the center of the sphere;
a is the sphere radius, n is the ratio of refractive indices inside and outside of the sphere, and λ the wavelength of the light.

This set of equations was first described by van de Hulst. There are extensions to more complicated geometries of scattering targets.

The anomalous diffraction approximation offers a very approximate but computationally fast technique to calculate light scattering by particles. The ratio of refractive indices has to be close to 1, and the size parameter should be large. However, semi-empirical extensions to small size parameters and larger refractive indices are possible. The main advantage of the ADT is that one can (a) calculate, in closed form, extinction, scattering, and absorption efficiencies for many typical size distributions; (b) find solution to the inverse problem of predicting size distribution from light scattering experiments (several wavelengths); (c) for parameterization purposes of single scattering (inherent) optical properties in radiative transfer codes.

Another limiting approximation for optically soft particles is Rayleigh scattering, which is valid for small size parameters.
