= Staffan Ström =

Swedish physicist and engineer (1934–2016)

Staffan Einar Ström
- Born: 14 September 1934; Gothenburg, Sweden
- Died: 28 August 2016 (aged 81)
- Education: Chalmers University of Technology
- Known for: Contributions to null field method
- Scientific career
- Fields: Physics
- Workplaces: Chalmers University of Technology; University of Texas at Austin; KTH Royal Institute of Technology
- Thesis: A Study of the Unitary Representations of Some Space-Time Transformation Groups (1967)
- Doctoral advisor: Nils Svartholm
- Other academic advisors: E. C. George Sudarshan
- Doctoral students: Sailing He

Staffan Einar Ström (14 September 1934 – 28 August 2016) was a Swedish physicist and engineer who was a professor at KTH Royal Institute of Technology. He is best known for his contributions to the null field method for electromagnetic, acoustic and elastodynamic problems.

== Life and career ==
Born on 14 September 1934 in Gothenburg, Ström received his undergraduate degree in electrical engineering from Chalmers University of Technology in 1959. He obtained his doctoral degree in mathematical physics in 1967 from the same institution under the supervision of Nils Svartholm. From 1969 to 1971, he served as a visiting research associate at University of Texas at Austin under the supervision of E. C. George Sudarshan, working on group theory. Following his return to Chalmers University of Technology, he formed the Applied Mathematical Physics research group, focusing on applied mathematics in elastodynamics, electrodynamics and acoustics. In 1984, he was appointed the Chair of Electromagnetic Theory at KTH Royal Institute of Technology, where he worked at until his retirement in 1999. Following his retirement, he has continued his research activities, leading research projects in antenna applications from 2000 to 2004.

Ström's early work focused on space-time transformation groups, such as Lorentz an Poincaré groups. His later work focused on the analysis of wave scattering: in the 1970s, he has made contributions to the null field method of Peter C. Waterman, extending it to more complex scattering geometries as well as an ensemble of scatterers. He has also worked on embedding algorithms for inverse scattering problems and coauthored the monograph, Time Domain Wave-Splitting and Inverse Problems.

Ström served as the chair of the Swedish National Committee of Radio Science under the Royal Swedish Academy of Sciences from 1994 to 2005. He was an active member of International Union of Radio Science, organizing the Electromagnetic Field Symposium in Stockholm in 1989 and chairing its Commission B from 1999 to 2002. In 2002, he was elected as a fellow of the IEEE "for contributions to null field approach to multiple scattering problems." He died on 28 August 2016, and was survived by his wife, their two daughters and his three siblings.

== Selected publications ==
Books

- He, Sailing; Strom, Staffan; Weston, Vaughan H. (1998). Time Domain Wave-Splittings and Inverse Problems. Oxford: Oxford University Press. ISBN 9780198565499.
- Sirenko, Yuriy K.; Yashina, Nataliya P.; Ström, Staffan, eds. (2007). Modeling and Analysis of Transient Processes in Open Resonant Structures. New York: Springer. ISBN 9780387308784.
- Sirenko, Yuriy K.; Ström, Staffan, eds. (2009). Modern Theory of Gratings. New York: Springer. ISBN 9781441911995.

Book chapters

- Boström, Anders; Kristensson, Gerhard; Ström, Staffan. "Transformation properties of plane, spherical and cylindrical scalar and vector wave functions". In Varadan, V. V; Lakhtakia, A.; Varadan, V. K. (eds.). Acoustic, Electromagnetic and Elastic Wave Scattering. Elsevier. pp. 165–210.

Journal articles

- Peterson, Bo; Ström, Staffan (1973). "T matrix for electromagnetic scattering from an arbitrary number of scatterers and representations of E(3)". Physical Review D. 8 (10): 3661–3678. doi:10.1103/PhysRevD.8.3661.
- Peterson, Bo; Ström, Staffan (1974). "Matrix formulation of acoustic scattering from an arbitrary number of scatterers". Journal of the Acoustical Society of America. 56: 771–780. doi:10.1121/1.1903325.
- Peterson, Bo; Ström, Staffan (1974). "T-matrix formulation of electromagnetic scattering from multilayered scatterers". Physical Review D. 10 (8): 2670–2684. doi:10.1103/PhysRevD.10.2670.
- Kristensson, Gerhard; Ström, Staffan (1978). "Scattering from buried inhomogeneities—a general three‐dimensional formalism". Journal of the Acoustical Society of America. 64: 917–936. doi:10.1121/1.382052.
- He, Sailing; Ström, Staffan (1991). "The electromagnetic scattering problem in the time domain for a dissipative slab and a point source using invariant imbedding". Journal of Mathematical Physics. 32: 3529–3539. doi:10.1063/1.529468.
