= Michael I. Mishchenko =

American atmospheric scientist (1959–2020)

- Михаил Иванович Мищенко
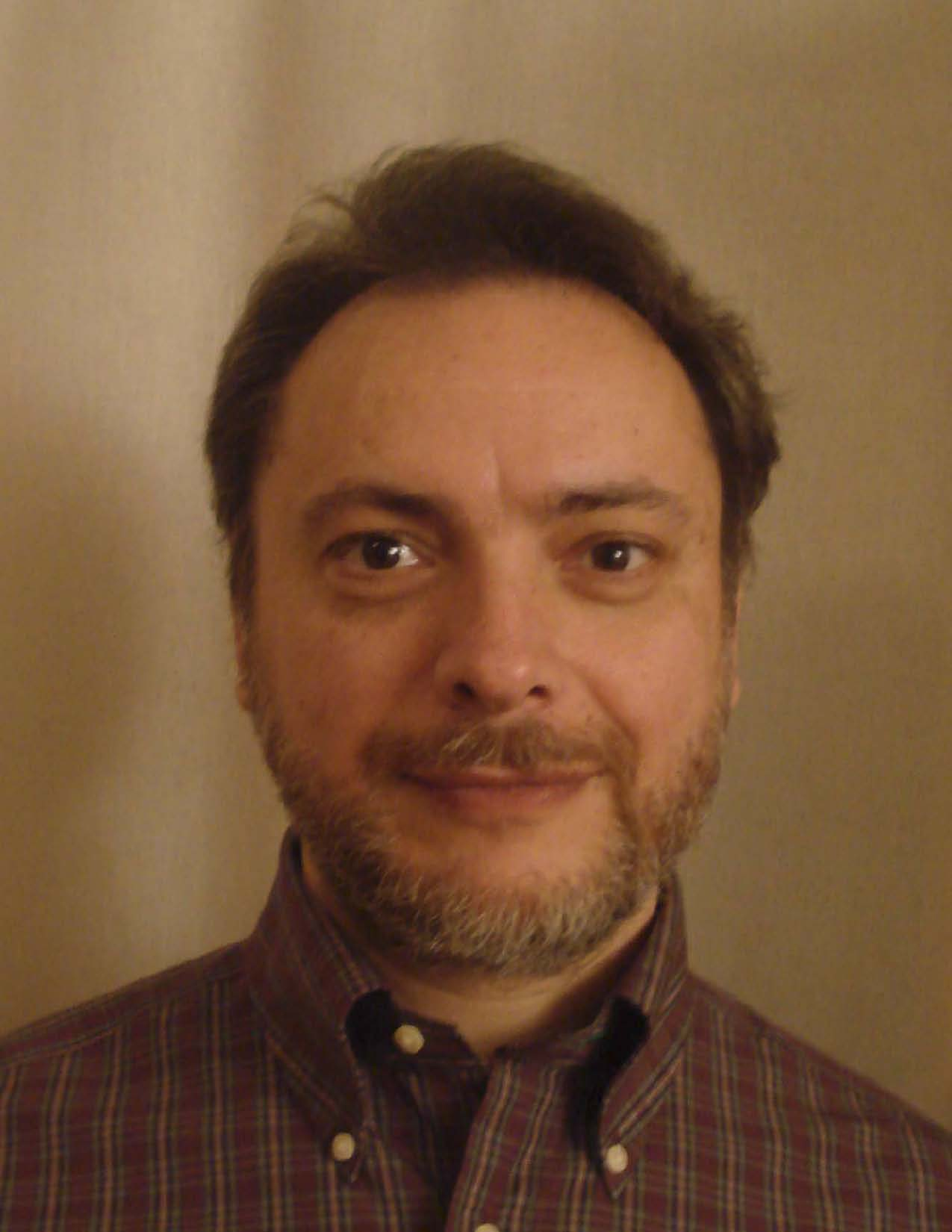
- Mishchenko c. 2007
- Born: Mikhail Ivanovich Mishchenko; 1959
- Died: July 21, 2020 (aged 60–61)
- Education: Moscow Institute of Physics and Technology; National Academy of Sciences of Ukraine
- Known for: T-matrix method; Radiative transfer theory; Glory
- Scientific career
- Fields: Atmospheric physics; Optics
- Workplaces: Goddard Institute for Space Studies; Main Astronomical Observatory, Kyiv
- Thesis: Electromagnetic Scattering in Random Dispersive Media: Fundamental Theory and Applications (1987)

Michael Ivanovich Mishchenko (1959 — July 21, 2020) was a Ukrainian American atmospheric physicist who was a senior scientist at Goddard Institute for Space Studies. He is best known for his contributions to the T-matrix method for the computation of light scattering by complex particles and clusters, and atmospheric radiative transfer theory.

== Biography ==
Mishchenko was born in 1959. Graduating from Moscow Institute of Physics and Technology in 1983, he received his PhD in physics with honors from the National Academy of Sciences of Ukraine in 1987. Initially being a part of the research staff at the Main Astronomical Observatory in Kyiv, he emigrated to the United States to join the Goddard Institute for Space Studies. Initially working as a contractor, he became a senior scientist at the institute in 1997. From 1998 to 2002, he served as project manager for the NASA/GEWEX Global Aerosol Climatology Project.

Mishchenko's research interests included electromagnetic scattering by morphologically complex particles and particle groups, polarimetry, aerosol and cloud remote sensing, and ocean optics. He was known for his work on the development of efficient T-matrix methods for the computation of light scattering by complex particles and clusters. The open source T-matrix package that he developed has been publicly available online since 1997 and has been subject to numerous peer reviewed publications and extensions. He has also derived a radiative transfer theory rigorous directly from the Maxwell equations, which defined the bounds of the radiative transfer equation and explained the nature of measurements taken with directional radiometers. He has also worked on retrieval of aerosol properties from space using radiance and polarization data; this work led to the development of the NASA Glory Space Mission, for which he served as a project scientist. His recent work before passing involved the first-principles analysis of effective medium approximations in remote sensing.

During his career, Mishchenko published multiple monographs on light scattering, remote sensing and radiative transfer, as well as 23 peer-reviewed book chapters and more than 300 journal papers. Being an elected fellow of American Geophysical Union, Optica, Institute of Physics and American Meteorological Society, he has served as a topical editor of the journal Applied Optics and was the editor-in-chief of the Journal of Quantitative Spectroscopy and Radiative Transfer from 2006 until his death.

Mishchenko died on July 21, 2020. Michael I. Mishchenko Medal, given annually by Journal of Quantitative Spectroscopy and Radiative Transfer to researchers with innovative contributions to radiative transfer, light scattering, and remote sensing, is named after him.

== Selected publications ==
Books

- Mishchenko, M. I; Hovenier, J. W.; Travis, L. D. (2000). Light Scattering by Nonspherical Particles: Theory, Measurements, and Applications. San Diego: Academic Press. p. 9780124986602.
- Mishchenko, M. I.; Travis, L. D.; Lacis, A. A. (2002). Scattering, Absorption, and Emission of Light by Small Particles. Cambridge: Cambridge University Press. ISBN 9780521782524.
- Mishchenko, M. I.; Travis, L. D.; Lacis, A. A. (2006). Multiple Scattering of Light by Particles: Radiative Transfer and Coherent Backscattering. Cambridge: Cambridge University Press. ISBN 9780521834902.
- Mishchenko, M. I.; et al. (2010). Polarimetric Remote Sensing of Solar System Objects. Kyiv: Akademperiodyka.
- Mishchenko, M. I.; Yatskiv, Ya. S.; Rosenbush, V. K.; Videen, G., eds. (2011). Polarimetric Detection, Characterization, and Remote Sensing, Springer. Dordrecht: Springer. ISBN 9789400716353.
- Mishchenko, M. I. (2014). Electromagnetic Scattering by Particles and Particle Groups: An Introduction. Cambridge: Cambridge University Press. ISBN 9781139019064.

Journal articles

- Mishchenko, M. I. (1991). "Light scattering by randomly oriented axially symmetric particles". Journal of the Optical Society of America A. 8 (6): 871–882. doi:10.1364/JOSAA.8.000871.
- Mackowski, Daniel W.; Mishchenko, Michael I. (1996). "Calculation of the T matrix and the scattering matrix for ensembles of spheres". Journal of the Optical Society of America A. 13 (11): 2266–2278. doi:10.1364/JOSAA.13.002266.
- Mishchenko, Michael I.; Travis, Larry D.; Mackowski, Daniel W. (1996). "T-matrix computations of light scattering by nonspherical particles: A review" (PDF). Journal of Quantitative Spectroscopy and Radiative Transfer. 55 (5): 535–575. doi:10.1016/0022-4073(96)00002-7.
- Mishchenko, Michael I.; Travis, Larry D.; Kahn, Ralph A.; West, Robert A. (1997). "Modeling phase functions for dustlike tropospheric aerosols using a shape mixture of randomly oriented polydisperse spheroids". Journal of Geophysical Research: Atmospheres. 102 (D14): 16831–16847. doi:10.1029/96JD02110.
- Mishchenko, Michael I.; Travis, Larry D. (1998). "Capabilities and limitations of a current FORTRAN implementation of the T-matrix method for randomly oriented, rotationally symmetric scatterers". Journal of Quantitative Spectroscopy and Radiative Transfer. 60 (3): 309–324. doi:10.1016/S0022-4073(98)00008-9.
- Zhang, Yuanchong; Rossow, William B.; Lacis, Andrew A.; Oinas, Valdar; Mishchenko, Michael I. (2004). "Calculation of radiative fluxes from the surface to top of atmosphere based on ISCCP and other global data sets: Refinements of the radiative transfer model and the input data". Journal of Geophysical Research: Atmospheres. 109 (D19): D19105. doi:10.1029/2003JD004457.
- Dubovik, Oleg; et al. (2006). "Application of spheroid models to account for aerosol particle nonsphericity in remote sensing of desert dust". Journal of Geophysical Research: Atmospheres. 111 (D11): D11208. doi:10.1029/2005JD006619. hdl:11603/33512.

== Awards ==
- AMS Henry G. Houghton Award
- Elsevier Hendrik C. van de Hulst Award
- François Arago Award in Polarimetric Remote Sensing
- 2010 State Prize of Ukraine in Science and Technology
- NASA Exceptional Scientific Achievement Medals
