= Peter C. Waterman =

American mathematician and physicist (1928–2012)

- Born: Peter Cary Waterman; June 14, 1928; Albany, New York, U.S.
- Died: June 3, 2012 (aged 83); West Yarmouth, Massachusetts, U.S.
- Education: Bethlehem Central High School
- Alma mater: Syracuse University; Brown University
- Known for: Extended boundary condition method; T-matrix method
- Children: Jonathan Waterman
- Scientific career
- Fields: Physics
- Institutions: Avco; Mitre Corporation; Pedersen Research; Union College
- Thesis: Multiple Scattering of Waves (1958)
- Doctoral advisor: Rohn Truell

Peter Cary Waterman (June 14, 1928 — June 3, 2012) was an American applied mathematician and physicist, known for his fundamental contributions to theory and computation of wave scattering in electromagnetics, optics and acoustics. He has introduced the extended boundary condition and T-matrix methods, widely used in the analysis of scattering in complex structures.

== Biography ==
Peter Cary Waterman was born on June 14, 1928, in Albany, New York. He graduated of Bethlehem Central High School in 1946 and received a bachelor's degree in physics from Syracuse University in 1951. From 1952 to 1953, he served as a physics instructor at Union College. He was later admitted to of Department of Applied Mathematics at Brown University under Alcoa Research Fellowship, receiving a master's degree. Studying elastic wave scattering under the supervision Rohn Truell, he received his PhD degree in applied mathematics in 1958.

Briefly serving as a researcher on gas mixtures at Linde Company, Waterman subsequently worked in the Research and Advanced Development Division of Avco from 1959 to 1965. His work at Avco focused on acoustic scattering. In 1965, he joined Mitre Corporation, where he resumed his work on wave scattering. After leaving Mitre in 1975, he worked as a consultant to various companies, including Digital Equipment Corporation and Panametrics, as well as teaching a graduate-level course on wave propagation at Northeastern University. He was a visiting professor at the Institute of Theoretical Physics at University of Gothenburg in 1980. In 1990, he joined Pedersen Research, Inc, where he resumed his work on electromagnetic and acoustic scattering. Waterman resumed his professional activities into his 80s, serving as a consultant to US Army.

Waterman's research was influential in light scattering communities. In 1965, he introduced the extended boundary condition method for the computation of electromagnetic scattering at objects with arbitrary shapes. He subsequently introduced the concept of T-matrix for acoustic scattering, which he later extended to electromagnetic and elastodynamic problems. The method has attracted significant attention from the computational physics community: in 1975, it was subject to an international symposium at Ohio State University, where it was hailed as "a major development [in computational physics] in the last ten years."

Waterman married Katherine Adella Dearstyne in 1954. They had three children, including Jonathan Waterman. They divorced in 1975. He married Karen Marlene Gates in 1996. Residing in West Yarmouth, Massachusetts, Waterman died on June 3, 2012. In 2012, Journal of Quantitative Spectroscopy and Radiative Transfer published a special issue in honor of Waterman's scientific legacy, which featured an unreleased paper from 1964 by Waterman and close collaborator John George Fikioris. Peter C. Waterman Award, given annually by Journal of Quantitative Spectroscopy and Radiative Transfer to early-career researchers on electromagnetic scattering, is named after him.

Waterman was a member of American Physical Society and Electromagnetics Academy, as well as a technical program committee member for the joint IEEE AP-S/URSI International Symposium.

== Selected publications ==
Journal articles

- Waterman, P. C. (1959). "Orientation dependence of elastic waves in single crystals". Physical Review. 113 (5): 1240. doi:10.1103/PhysRev.113.1240.*
- Waterman, P. C.; Truell, Rohn (1961). "Multiple scattering of waves". Journal of Mathematical Physics. 2: 512–537. doi:10.1063/1.1703737.
- Fikioris, J. G.; Waterman, P. C. (1964). "Multiple scattering of waves II: "Hole corrections" in the scalar case". Journal of Mathematical Physics. 5: 1413–1420. doi:10.1063/1.1704077.
- Waterman, P. C. (1965). "Matrix formulation of electromagnetic scattering". Proceedings of the IEEE. 53 (8): 805–812. doi:10.1109/PROC.1965.4058.
- Waterman, P. C. (1969). "New formulation of acoustic scattering". Journal of the Acoustical Society of America. 45: 1417–1429. doi:10.1121/1.1911619.
- Waterman, P. C. (1971). "Symmetry, unitarity, and geometry in electromagnetic scattering". Physical Review D. 3 (4): 825–839. doi:10.1103/PhysRevD.3.825.
- Waterman, P. C. (1975). "Scattering by periodic surfaces". Journal of the Acoustical Society of America. 57: 791–802. doi:10.1121/1.380521.
- Waterman, P. C. (1976). "Matrix theory of elastic wave scattering". Journal of the Acoustical Society of America. 60: 567–580. doi:10.1121/1.1911619.
