= T-matrix method =

Technique for computing light scattering by nonspherical particles

The transition matrix method (T-matrix method or TMM) is a computational technique of light scattering by nonspherical particles originally formulated by Peter C. Waterman in 1965. The technique is also known as null field method and extended boundary condition method (EBCM). In the method, matrix elements are obtained by matching boundary conditions for solutions of Maxwell equations. It has been greatly extended to incorporate diverse types of linear media occupying the region enclosing the scatterer. T-matrix method proves to be highly efficient and has been widely used in computing electromagnetic scattering of single and compound particles.

== Definition of the T-matrix ==
The incident and scattered electric field are expanded into spherical vector wave functions (SVWF), which are also encountered in Mie scattering. They are the fundamental solutions of the vector Helmholtz equation and can be generated from the scalar fundamental solutions in spherical coordinates, the spherical Bessel functions of the first kind and the spherical Hankel functions. Accordingly, there are two linearly independent sets of solutions denoted as $\mathbf{M}^1,\mathbf{N}^1$ and $\mathbf{M}^3,\mathbf{N}^3$, respectively. They are also called regular and outgoing SVWFs, respectively. With this, we can write the incident field as

$$\mathbf{E}_{inc}= \sum_{n=1}^\infty \sum_{m=-n}^n\left( a_{mn} \mathbf{M}^1_{mn}+ b_{mn} \mathbf{N}^1_{mn}\right).$$

The scattered field is expanded into radiating SVWFs:

$$\mathbf{E}_{scat}= \sum_{n=1}^\infty \sum_{m=-n}^n\left( f_{mn} \mathbf{M}^3_{mn}+ g_{mn} \mathbf{N}^3_{mn}\right).$$

The T-matrix relates the expansion coefficients of the incident field to those of the scattered field.

$$\begin{pmatrix} f_{mn}\\ g_{mn}\end{pmatrix} = T \begin{pmatrix} a_{mn} \\ b_{mn} \end{pmatrix}$$

The T-matrix is determined by the scatterer shape and material and for a given incident field allows one to calculate the scattered field.

== Calculation of the T-matrix ==
The standard way to calculate the T-matrix is the null-field method, which relies on the Stratton–Chu equations. They basically state that the electromagnetic fields outside a given volume can be expressed as integrals over the surface enclosing the volume involving only the tangential components of the fields on the surface. If the observation point is located inside this volume, the integrals vanish.

By making use of the boundary conditions for the tangential field components on the scatterer surface,

$$\mathbf{n} \times (\mathbf{E}_{scat} + \mathbf{E}_{inc}) =\mathbf{n} \times \mathbf{E}_{int}$$

and

$$\mathbf{n} \times (\mathbf{H}_{scat} + \mathbf{H}_{inc}) = \mathbf{n} \times \mathbf{H}_{int}$$,

where $\mathbf{n}$ is the normal vector to the scatterer surface, one can derive an integral representation of the scattered field in terms of the tangential components of the internal fields on the scatterer surface. A similar representation can be derived for the incident field.

By expanding the internal field in terms of SVWFs and exploiting their orthogonality on spherical surfaces, one arrives at an expression for the T-matrix. The T-matrix can also be computed from far field data. This approach avoids numerical stability issues associated with the null-field method.

Several numerical codes for the evaluation of the T-matrix can be found online.

The T matrix can be found with methods other than null field method and extended boundary condition method (EBCM); therefore, the term "T-matrix method" is infelicitous.

Improvement of traditional T-matrix includes Invariant-imbedding T-matrix Method (IITM) by B. R. Johnson. The numerical code of IITM is developed by Lei Bi, based on Michael I. Mishchenko's EBCM code. It is more powerful than EBCM as it is more efficient and increases the upper limit of particle size during the computation.

== Software ==
A Fortran implementation for rotationally symmetric particles was released in 1998 by Mishchenko and Larry Travis. A parallelized version for sphere clusters was released in 2011.

=== Treams (Python) ===
treams is an open-source software package for calculations of electromagnetic scattering based on the T-matrix method. It can be used for finite and periodic arrangements of scatterers of different schapes. treams computes T-matrices analytically for spheres and for infinitely long cylinders, including multilayered spheres and cylinders. It can also import external T-matrices, e.g. from T-matrix database. If the T-matrices of single scatterers are known, T-matrices of corresponding clusters and periodic arrays of these scatterers can be also calculated. Then the quantities such as fields outside the structures, scattering, extinction and absorption cross-sections, multipolar decompositions may be extracted.

Periodic systems can be considered in different dimensions. Particle arrays can be placed near multilayered substrates, for which transmission and reflection can be calculated. Fore some geometries, the package can be also used to compute band structures.

Isotropic chiral media are implemented directly, and scatterers from anisotropic material can be introduced through externally calculated T-matrices.

==== Method ====
Incident and scattered fields are expanded into a set of basis functions. Fields expanded into vector spherical harmonics can be represented in helicity or parity (TE/TM) bases, also cylindrical harmonics basis and plane wave basis are available. The T-matrix of a nanostructure connects the coefficients of the incident field with those of the scattered field. For clusters and arrays, the fields scattered by one particle act as incident fields for the others, and the basis change is performed using translation addition theorems

For periodic systems, the same interaction has to be summed over the repeated lattice. treams evaluates these sums using the Ewald method.

==== Applications ====
treams has been used for dispersion and band-structure calculations in periodic plasmonic lattices, for the electromagnetic response of metasurfaces coupled to quantum-emitter arrays, and for reflectance calculations of transition-metal dichalcogenide nanosphere arrays. It has also been discussed in comparison with other multiple-scattering codes such as Multem 3 and described as a T-matrix toolkit for periodic structures in a paper on TorchGDM, which also uses an interface to treams for T-matrix- and Mie-based effective-model construction. An acoustic implementation, acoustotreams, was introduced in 2026.
