= Jonathan Waterman =

American writer and photographer (born 1956)

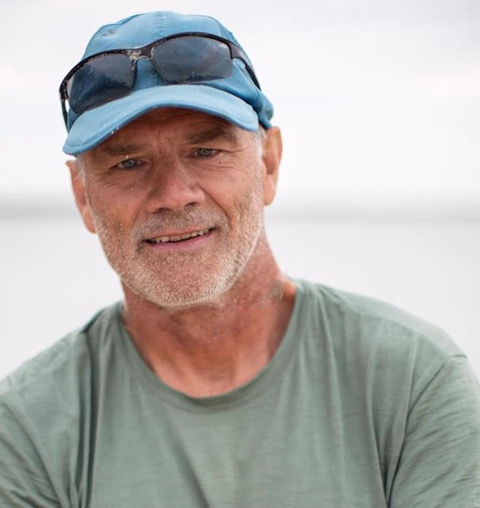
- Waterman in 2024
- Born: 1956 (age 69–70); Providence, Rhode Island, U.S.
- Occupations: Writer, adventurer, photographer, environmentalist
- Father: Peter C. Waterman

Jonathan Waterman (born 1956) is an American writer, adventurer, and environmentalist. He has written 17 nonfiction books, and his work has appeared in many journals, including The New York Times, Outside, Backpacker, National Geographic Adventure, Adventure Journal, and Men’s Journal. Working as talent, team leader, videographer, and writer, he has conceived or contributed to a half dozen adventure films including productions by WGBH, the Outdoor Life Network, and ESPN.

== Early writing ==
Waterman wrote his first book, Surviving Denali, in 1982, while working as a Denali Mountaineering Ranger, tasked with educating, and sometimes rescuing, climbers in that national park. To address the many avoidable mishaps on that Alaskan mountain, he identified the patterns behind accidents, and wrote the book to reduce deaths and rescues. He named it Surviving Denali (rather than Mt. McKinley) in honor of the original Athapaskan name for the mountain, although it would take another 23 years for the federal government to change the name back to Denali. The book went through numerous reprints over four decades and he considers it one of his most important books because it has saved lives.

In 1988, he published High Alaska, a mountaineering guidebook and a history of climbing on Denali and Mounts Foraker and Hunter. Waterman believed that an anecdotal history would build respect and appreciation for the mountains and the pioneer climbers. Waterman gathered the personal histories and stories from many of the first ascensionists. Then he selected the best route photographs from the aerial collection of his mentor Bradford Washburn.

His third book, published in 1994, is also about North America's highest mountain. In the Shadow of Denali is a compilation of stories focused on the personal illumination gained from climbing mountains.

== Environmental inspirations ==
Inspired as a teenager by the environmental writings of Peter Matthiessen, Rachel Carson, and Edward Abbey, in 1993 he paddled a sea kayak 800 miles down the Gulf of California to write a book about the decline of the sea. Kayaking the Vermilion Sea won the “Best Adventure Travel” book award in Canada's Banff Mountain Book Festival in 1995.

In 2001 Waterman published Arctic Crossing to chronicle his 2,200-mile paddle, sail, dogsled and ski trek across the roof of North America in a linear narrative. The mostly solo journey—accomplished in over a half dozen different trips—took him ten months from July 1997 through September 1999. He had financed the trip by making an adventure film “Odyssey Among the Inuit” for the Outdoor Life Network, filming much of the journey by himself and writing the script for the two part television series. The book won an honorable mention in the National Outdoor Book awards, and the Best Adventure Travel book at the Banff Book Festival. In 2004, Waterman was awarded a Literary Fellowship to the National Endowment for the Arts.

That year he also published Where Mountains Are Nameless, the title taken from the opening stanza of the Robert Service poem the Spell of the Yukon. Waterman's father Peter, a pianist, had composed music to Service's verse and gave the book The Spell of the Yukon, to Jon as a gift for his first trip to Alaska in 1976. Waterman's 2004 book, a nonlinear narrative, was based on numerous journeys the author had taken into the Arctic National Wildlife Refuge. His essays were juxtaposed with biographical sketches about Olaus and Mardy Murie, who lobbied to create the Arctic National Wildlife Range in 1960. Waterman wrote the book primarily to raise awareness about the beauty of the refuge and to prevent oil drilling on its wildlife rich coastal plain. In 2005 Where Mountains Are Nameless won the Sigurd Olson Nature Writing Award. Waterman followed up with an editorial in the Washington Post to continue raising support for wilderness protection of the coastal plain to prevent oil drilling.

In 2010, Waterman published his tenth book Running Dry. Concerned about not being able to irrigate his family's outdoor vegetable garden with his well water because water rights had already been claimed somewhere downstream in Colorado, he wanted to learn about water rights and the state's namesake river. As a National Geographic Explorer, financed by the second of his three National Geographic grants, he set off downstream, mostly alone, and spent five months paddling 1,450 miles from source to sea on the Colorado River and became the first person to journey the length of the river from the Colorado headwaters to Mexico. When the river dried up at the Mexican border, he walked the last 90 miles to the Gulf of California.

== Seeking change ==
Waterman's career revolves around rugged, immersion journeys, traveling broad sweeps of landscape and seas and rivers to establish a sense of place so that he could defend an otherwise defenseless nature. As he told one interviewer in 2014:

What’s wrong with the idea of passionately speaking out for the causes you believe in?” We tend to be much more passive today about standing up for our natural places. We have a great battle against us because there is a machine out there rapidly gobbling up these beautiful places and natural resources. We need to figure out how to preserve them today. We have to emotionally connect and show people the value of these places. Much of our civilization today is divorced from wilderness...Most don't even know the meaning of a wild river.

In an effort to effect change, Waterman wrote a February 2014 op-ed for The New York Times urging the International Boundary Water Commissioners to add a minute to the treaty that would allow water to be released into the dry Colorado River Delta. That spring, the newly created Minute 319 allowed an historic pulse flow of river water into the Delta. Through grant writing and fund raising, Waterman continued his public outreach by creating a traveling photo exhibit, another book The Colorado River: Flowing through Conflict, a detailed river basin map, and lectures across North America about the beleaguered river. He also acted as talent, videographer, and writer for two films, including Chasing Water by Pete McBride, who mostly traveled the river basin in airplanes and accompanied Waterman for two days in the headwaters and a week in the delta.

== Photography ==
Waterman exposed tens of thousands of images and shot video on most of his journeys. In his 12th book, Northern Exposures, he wrote about his photography in this anthology of previously published essays “Even when they appeared as ghosted-out, black-and-white chapter openings or shared space with glossy color advertisements in magazines, I took consolation that my images were more than just research tools for injecting imagery into my prose.”

His fourth book about Denali, Chasing Denali, published in 2018, details the legendary yet disputed first ascent of the mountain in 2010 by four gold miners. Waterman, who had made the first winter ascent of the mountain by the Cassin Ridge in 1982, returned to Denali to reach the summit on his 60th birthday. Through his own repeated climbs and time as a rescue ranger on the mountain, he analyzes how four inexperienced mountaineers might have made the climb in 18 hours more than a century ago.

In 2019 Waterman published Atlas of the National Parks for National Geographic Books. The 90,000-word, third-person narrative with hundreds of photographs and maps unveils the geologic, human, and natural history of 61 national parks. The best-selling book also covered loss of habitat and climate change issues within the parks, and Waterman continued to sound the alarm with new essays for The New York Times, The L.A. Times, The Seattle Times, Outside, and Men’s Journal.

Four years later, Waterman published Atlas of Wild America, 60 years after the signing of the Wilderness Act. The oversized book is part of a three-Atlas contract Waterman signed with National Geographic Books. The book contains 17 of Waterman's images, including wilderness landscapes he photographed from small planes. On the book's publication date, Waterman wrote an editorial for The New York Times about a massacre of 99 bears over 17 days in 2023 in some of the public lands detailed in Atlas of Wild America.

== Continued advocacy ==
In November 2024 Waterman published his 16th book Into the Thaw. The first-person memoir documents extraordinary changes in the Arctic over the past four decades of Waterman's northern travels as rising temperatures have caused extensive thawing of the permafrost, diminishment of sea ice, and the impacts on wildlife and culture. He encapsulated the book in a New York Times editorial, encouraging readers to rethink their lives as fossil fuel consumers. Into the Thaw won "Best Adventure Travel" book at the 2025 Banff Film and Book Festival.

== Personal life ==
Jonathan "Jon" Waterman was born in Providence, Rhode Island, raised in Massachusetts, and has lived in Colorado since 1989 with many returns to his former home state of Alaska. He is the son of the mathematical physicist Peter C. Waterman, and has two sons, Nicholas (born 2002) and Alistair (born 2006). At 16 he attended the North Carolina Outward Bound School, which set the trajectory for his time as an Appalachian Mountain Club hut boy, a Colorado Outward Bound Instructor, wilderness guide, national park service ranger, and a lifelong adventurer.

== Publications ==
=== Books ===
- Into the Thaw: Witnessing Wonder Amid the Arctic Climate Crisis, Patagonia Books, 2024, ISBN 978-1-952338-23-6
- Atlas of Wild America, National Geographic Books, 2023, ISBN 9781426222351
- Atlas of the National Parks, National Geographic Books, 2019, ISBN 9781426220579
- Chasing Denali: The Sourdoughs, Cheechakos, and Frauds Behind the Most Unbelievable Feat in Mountaineering, Lyons Press, 2018, ISBN 9781493035199
- Northern Exposures: An Adventuring Career in Stories and Images, University of Alaska Press, 2013, ISBN 978-1602231924
- The Colorado River: Flowing Through Conflict, Westcliffe Publishers, 2010, ISBN 9781565796461
- Running Dry: A Journey from Source to Sea Down the Colorado River, National Geographic Books, 2010, ISBN 978-1426205057
- Where Mountains Are Nameless: Passion and Politics in the Arctic National Wildlife Refuge, W. W. Norton & Company, 2005, ISBN 9780393052190
- Arctic Crossing: A Journey Through the Northwest Passage and Inuit Culture, Alfred A. Knopf, 2001, ISBN 9781585747306
- The Quotable Climber: Literary, Humorous, Inspirational, and Fearful Moments of Climbing, Lyons Press, 1998, ISBN 9781558217188
- A Most Hostile Mountain: Re-Creating the Duke of Abruzzi’s Historic Expedition on Alaska’s Mount St. Elias, Henry Holt & Company, 1997, ISBN 978-0805044539
- Kayaking the Vermilion Sea: Eight Hundred Miles Down the Baja, Simon & Schuster, 1995, ISBN 978-0684803388
- In the Shadow of Denali: Life and Death on Alaska’s Mt. McKinley, Doubleday, Bantam, Dell, 1994, ISBN 978-0385312455
- Cloud Dancers: Portraits of North American Mountaineers, AAC Press, 1993, ISBN 978-0930410544
- High Alaska: A Historical Guide to Denali, Mount Foraker & Mount Hunter, AAC Press, 1988, ISBN 978-0930410322
- Surviving Denali: A Study of Accidents on Mount McKinley, AAC Press, 1983, ISBN 978-0930410186

=== Selected articles ===
- The Worst Kind of Type 2 Fun in the Arctic, Outside, Oct 22, 2024.
- Alaska’s Slaughter of Bears Must Stop, The New York Times, Aug 20, 2023.
- "End of the Everglades?", Men's Journal, Sept 23, 2020.
- "The 8 Most Endangered National Parks", Outside, June 15, 2020.
- "Confessions of a Snowman", WildSnow.com, Nov 23, 2019.
- "The American Nile", National Geographic, 2015.
- "Liquid Courage", American Photo Magazine, July- August 2011.
- "What We Would Lose in Alaska", Washington Post, June 5, 2005.
- "The Kayak and the Cruiseship", Hooked On the Outdoors, August 2004.
- "Roughing It Gently", Backpacker, August 1991, page 48.
- "The Conscience Of The Northeast Mountains", Backpacker, April 1991, page 32.

== Awards and recognition ==
- 2024 Cartography and Geographic Society's “Best Atlas of the Year Award” for Atlas of Wild America
- 2019 Cartography and Geographic Society's “Best Atlas of the Year Award” for Atlas of the National Parks
- Four Banff Festival "Best Book Adventure Travel" titles
  - 2025 Into the Thaw
  - 2010 Running Dry
  - 2001 Arctic Crossing
  - 1995 Kayaking the Vermilion Sea
- 2005 Sigurd Olson Nature Writing Award for Where Mountains Are Nameless, W.W. Norton
- 2004 NEA Literary Fellowship for Arctic Crossing, Knopf
- 2003 Colorado State Council of the Arts Literary Award
- 1996 American Alpine Club Literary Award
- 1984 National Park Service Special Achievement Award (Rescue Work)
- 1983 American Alpine Club Literary Award for Surviving Denali
