= Spinor spherical harmonics =

Special functions on a sphere

In quantum mechanics, the spinor spherical harmonics (also known as spin spherical harmonics, spinor harmonics and Pauli spinors) are special functions defined over the sphere. The spinor spherical harmonics are the natural spinor analog of the vector spherical harmonics. While the standard spherical harmonics are a basis for the angular momentum operator, the spinor spherical harmonics are a basis for the total angular momentum operator (angular momentum plus spin). These functions are used in analytical solutions to Dirac equation in a radial potential. The spinor spherical harmonics are sometimes called Pauli central field spinors, in honor of Wolfgang Pauli who employed them in the solution of the hydrogen atom with spin–orbit interaction.

== Properties ==
The spinor spherical harmonics Y_{l, s, j, m} are the spinor's eigenstates of the total angular momentum operator squared:

$$\begin{align}
\mathbf j^2 Y_{l, s, j, m} &= j (j + 1) Y_{l, s, j, m} \\
\mathrm j_{\mathrm z} Y_{l, s, j, m} &= m Y_{l, s, j, m}\;;\;m=-j,-(j-1),\cdots,j-1,j\\
\mathbf l^2 Y_{l, s, j, m} &= l (l + 1) Y_{l, s, j, m}\\
\mathbf s^2 Y_{l, s, j, m} &= s (s + 1) Y_{l, s, j, m}
\end{align}$$

where j = l + s, where j, l, and s are the (dimensionless) total, orbital and spin angular momentum operators, j is the total azimuthal quantum number and m is the total magnetic quantum number.

Under a parity operation, we have

$$P Y_{l, s j, m}
= (-1)^{l}Y_{l,s, j, m}.$$

For spin-1/2 systems, they are given in matrix form by

$$Y_{l, \pm\frac{1}{2}, j, m}
= \frac{1}{\sqrt{2 \bigl(j \mp \frac{1}{2}\bigr) + 1}}
\begin{pmatrix}
\pm \sqrt{j \mp \frac{1}{2} \pm m + \frac{1}{2}} Y_{l}^{m - \frac{1}{2}} \\
\sqrt{j \mp \frac{1}{2} \mp m + \frac{1}{2}} Y_{l}^{m + \frac{1}{2}}
\end{pmatrix}.$$

where $Y_{l}^{m}$ are the usual spherical harmonics.
