= Sailing He =

Sailing He from the KTH Royal Institute of Technology, Stockholm, Sweden was named Fellow of the Institute of Electrical and Electronics Engineers (IEEE) in 2013 for contributions to subwavelength photonics.
