= Journal of Quantitative Spectroscopy and Radiative Transfer =

Scientific journal

- Discipline: Optics, spectroscopy, radiative heat transfer
- Language: English
- Edited by: Peter Bernath, Mathieu Francoeur, Miroslav Kocifaj

Publication details
- History: 1961—present
- Publisher: Elsevier
- Frequency: Irregular
- Impact factor: 2 (2025)

Standard abbreviations
- ISO 4: J. Quant. Spectrosc. Radiat. Transfer

Indexing
- CODEN: JQSRAE
- ISSN: 0022-4073 (print); 1879-1352 (web)

Links
- Journal homepage; Online access; Online archive

Journal of Quantitative Spectroscopy and Radiative Transfer is a peer-reviewed scientific journal published by Elsevier. Established in 1961, it covers research in optics and spectroscopy, including light scattering, radiative heat transfer and computational methods. Its founding editor-in-chief was Stanford S. Penner. Peter Bernath (Old Dominion University), Mathieu Francoeur (University of Utah) and Miroslav Kocifaj (Slovak Academy of Sciences) serve as the current editors-in-chief.

== Abstracting and indexing ==
The journal is abstracted and indexed in:

- Chemical Abstracts Core
- Current Contents/Physical, Chemical & Earth Sciences
- Ei Compendex
- GEOBASE
- EBSCO databases
- Science Citation Index Expanded
- Inspec
- Scopus

According to the Journal Citation Reports, the journal has a 2025 impact factor of 2.
