= Cross section =

Cross section may refer to:

- Cross section (geometry)
  - Cross-sectional views in architecture and engineering 3D
- Cross section (geology)
- Cross section (electronics)
- Radar cross section, measure of detectability
- Cross section (physics)
  - Absorption cross section
  - Nuclear cross section
  - Neutron cross section
  - Photoionisation cross section
  - Gamma ray cross section
- Cross Section (album), 1956 musical album by Billy Taylor

== See also ==
- Cross section (fiber), microscopic view of textile fibers.
- Section (fiber bundle), in differential and algebraic geometry and topology, a section of a fiber bundle or sheaf
- Cross-sectional data, in statistics, econometrics, and medical research, a data set drawn from a single point in time
  - Cross-sectional study, a scientific investigation utilizing cross-sectional data
    - Cross-sectional regression, a particular statistical technique for carrying out a cross-sectional study
