= Gamma ray cross section =

Probability that a gamma ray interacts with matter

Graph showing results for incident gamma ray energies of 0.51, 1.20, and 2.76 Mev.

A gamma ray cross section is a measure of the probability that a gamma ray interacts with matter. The total cross section of gamma ray interactions is composed of several independent processes: photoelectric effect, Compton (incoherent) scattering, electron–positron pair production in the nucleus field and electron–positron pair production in the electron field (triplet production). The cross section for single process listed above is a part of the total gamma ray cross section.

Other effects, like the photonuclear absorption, Thomson or Rayleigh (coherent) scattering can be omitted because of their nonsignificant contribution in the gamma ray range of energies.

The detailed equations for cross sections (barn/atom) of all mentioned effects connected with gamma ray interaction with matter are listed below.

== Photoelectric effect cross section ==
The photoelectric effect phenomenon describes the interaction of a gamma photon with an electron located in the atomic structure. This results in the ejection of that electron from the atom. The photoelectric effect is the dominant energy transfer mechanism for X-ray and gamma ray photons with energies below 50 keV. It is much less important at higher energies, but still needs to be taken into consideration.

Usually, the cross section of the photoeffect can be approximated by the simplified equation

$$\sigma_{ph} = \frac{16}{3}\sqrt{2}\pi {r_\text{e}}^2 \alpha^4 \frac{Z^5}{k^{3.5}} \approx 5 \cdot 10^{11} \frac{Z^5}{E_\gamma^{3.5}}\, \mathrm{b}$$

where k = E_{γ} / E_{e}, and where E_{γ} = hν is the photon energy given and E_{e} = m_{e}c^{2} ≈ 5.11×10^{5} eV is the electron rest mass energy, Z is an atomic number of the absorber's element, α = e^{2}/(ħc) ≈ 1/137 is the fine-structure constant, and r_{e}^{2} = e^{4}/E_{e}^{2} ≈ 0.07941 b is the square of the classical electron radius in barns.

For higher precision, however, the Sauter equation is more appropriate:

$$\sigma_\text{ph} = \frac{3}{2} \phi_0 \alpha^4  \biggl(Z \frac{E_\text{e}}{E_\gamma} \biggr)^5 (\gamma^2-1)^{3/2} \Biggl[\frac{4}{3}+\frac{\gamma(\gamma-2)}{\gamma+1} \Biggl(1-\frac{1}{2\gamma(\gamma^2-1)^{1/2} }  \ln \frac{\gamma+(\gamma^2-1)^{1/2}}{\gamma-(\gamma^2-1)^{1/2}}\Biggr)\Biggr]$$

where

$$\gamma=\frac{E_\gamma-E_\text{B}+E_\text{e}}{E_\text{e}}$$

and E_{B} is a binding energy of electron, and ϕ_{0} is a Thomson cross section (ϕ_{0} = 8πe^{4}/(3E_{e}^{2}) ≈ 0.66526 barn).

For higher energies (> 0.5 MeV) the cross section of the photoelectric effect is very small because other effects (especially Compton scattering) dominates. However, for precise calculations of the photoeffect cross section in high energy range, the Sauter equation shall be substituted by the Pratt–Scofield equation

$$\sigma_\text{ph}=Z^5 \Biggl(\sum_{n=1}^4 \frac{a_n+b_n Z}{1+c_n Z} k^{-p_n} \Biggr)$$

where all input parameters are presented in the Table below.

n	a_{n}	b_{n}	c_{n}	p_{n}
1	1.6268×10^{−9}	−2.683×10^{−12}	4.173×10^{−2}	1
2	1.5274×10^{−9}	−5.110×10^{−13}	1.027×10^{−2}	2
3	1.1330×10^{−9}	−2.177×10^{−12}	2.013×10^{−2}	3.5
4	−9.12×10^{−11}	0	0	4

== Compton scattering cross section ==
Compton scattering (or Compton effect) is an interaction in which an incident gamma photon interacts with an atomic electron to cause its ejection and scatter of the original photon with lower energy. The probability of Compton scattering decreases with increasing photon energy. Compton scattering is thought to be the principal absorption mechanism for gamma rays in the intermediate energy range 100 keV to 10 MeV.

The cross section of the Compton effect is described by the Klein–Nishina equation:

$$\sigma_\text{C} = Z 2 \pi {r_\text{e}}^2 \Biggl\{ \frac{1+k}{k^2}  \Biggl[ \frac{2(1+k)}{1+2k}-\frac{\ln{(1+2k)}}{k} \Biggr] + \frac{\ln{(1+2k)}}{2k} - \frac{1+3k}{(1+2k)^2} \Biggr\}$$

for energies higher than 100 keV (k>0.2). For lower energies, however, this equation shall be substituted by:

$$\sigma_\text{C} = Z \frac{8}{3} \pi {r_\text{e}}^2 \frac{1}{(1+2k)^2} \biggl(1 + 2k + \frac{6}{5} k^2 - \frac{1}{2} k^3+\frac{2}{7} k^4-\frac{6}{35}  k^5+\frac{8}{105} k^6+\frac{4}{105} k^7 \biggr) ,$$

which is proportional to the absorber's atomic number, Z.

The additional cross section connected with the Compton effect can be calculated for the energy transfer coefficient only – the absorption of the photon energy by the electron:

$$\sigma_{\text{C},\text{abs}}=Z 2 \pi {r_\text{e}}^2 \biggl[ \frac{2(1+k)^2}{k^2 (1+2k) } - \frac{1+3k}{(1+2k)^2} -\frac{(1+k)(2k^2-2k-1)}{k^2(1+2k)^2}-\frac{4k^2}{3(1+2k)^3}- \Bigl( \frac{1+k}{k^3} -\frac{1}{2k} + \frac{1}{2k^3} \Bigr) \ln{(1+2k)} \biggr] ,$$

which is often used in radiation protection calculations.

== Pair production (in nucleus field) cross section ==
By interaction with the electric field of a nucleus, the energy of the incident photon is converted into the mass of an electron–positron (e^{−}e^{+}) pair. The cross section for the pair production effect is usually described by the Maximon equation:

$\sigma_\text{pair}=Z^2 \alpha {r_\text{e}}^2 \frac{2\pi}{3} \biggl(\frac{k-2}{k}\biggr)^3 \biggl( 1 + \frac{1}{2}\rho + \frac{23}{40}\rho^2 + \frac{11}{60}\rho^3 + \frac{29}{960}\rho^4 \biggr)$ for low energies (k < 4),

where

$$\rho = \frac{2k-4}{2+k+2\sqrt{2k}} .$$

However, for higher energies (k > 4) the Maximon equation has a form

$$\sigma_\text{pair}=Z^2  \alpha {r_\text{e}}^2  \Biggl\{ \frac{28}{9}  \ln{2k}-\frac{218}{27}
+(\frac{2}{k})^2 \biggl[6 \ln{2k}-\frac{7}{2}+\frac{2}{3} \ln^3{2k}-\ln^2{2k} -\frac{1}{3} \pi^2  \ln{2k}+2 \zeta (3)+\frac{\pi^2}{6} \biggr]
-(\frac{2}{k})^4 \biggl[\frac{3}{16} \ln{2k}+\frac{1}{8} \biggr]-(\frac{2}{k})^6 \biggl[\frac{29}{9\cdot256} \ln{2k}-\frac{77}{27\cdot512} \biggr] \Biggr\}$$

where ζ(3) ≈ 1.2020569 is the Riemann zeta function. The energy threshold for the pair production effect is k = 2 (the positron and electron rest mass energy).

== Triplet production cross section ==
The triplet production effect, where positron and electron is produced in the field of other electron, is similar to the pair production, with the threshold at k = 4. This effect, however, is much less probable than the pair production in the field of the nucleus. The most popular form of the triplet cross section was formulated as Borsellino–Ghizzetti equation

$$\begin{align}\sigma_\text{trip}=Z  \alpha {r_\text{e}}^2  \Biggl[ \frac{28}{9}  \ln{2k}-\frac{218}{27}
&+ \frac{1}{k}\biggl(-\frac{4}{3}\ln^3{2k} + 3\ln^2{2k} - \frac{60+16a}{3} \ln{2k} + \frac{123+12a+16b}{3} \biggr)\\
&+\frac{1}{k^2}  \biggl( \frac{8}{3}\ln^3{2k} - 4\ln^2{2k} + \frac{51+32a}{3} \ln{2k} - \frac{123+32a+64b}{6}    \biggr)\\
&+\frac{1}{k^3}  \biggl( \ln^2{2k} - \frac{53}{9} \ln{2k} - \frac{2915-288a}{216}    \biggr)\\
&+\frac{1}{k^4}  \biggl( -\frac{49}{18} \ln{2k}  - \frac{115}{432}    \biggr)\\
&+\frac{1}{k^5}  \biggl( -\frac{77}{36} \ln{2k}  - \frac{10831}{8640}    \biggr)\\
&+\frac{1}{k^6}  \biggl( -\frac{641}{300} \ln{2k}  - \frac{64573}{36000}    \biggr)\\
&+\frac{1}{k^7}  \biggl( -\frac{4423}{1800} \ln{2k}  - \frac{394979}{216000}    \biggr)
\Biggl]\end{align}$$

where a = −2.4674 and b = −1.8031. This equation is quite long, so Haug proposed simpler analytical forms of triplet cross section. Especially for the lowest energies 4 < k < 4.6:

$$\sigma_{\text{trip},\text{H}} = Z \alpha {r_\text{e}}^2 [5.6+20.4 (k-4)-10.9 (k-4)^2-3.6 (k-4)^3+7.4 (k-4)^4]  10^{-3} (k-4)^2$$

For 4.6 < k < 6:

$$\sigma_{\text{trip},\text{H}} = Z \alpha {r_\text{e}}^2 (0.582814-0.29842 k+0.04354 k^2-0.0012977 k^3 )$$

For 6 < k < 18:

$$\sigma_{\text{trip},\text{H}}=Z \alpha {r_\text{e}}^2 \biggl( \frac{3.1247-1.3394 k+0.14612 k^2}{1+0.4648 k+0.016683 k^2}  \biggr)$$

For k > 14 Haug proposed to use a shorter form of Borsellino equation:

$$\sigma_{\text{trip},\text{H}}=Z  \alpha {r_\text{e}}^2  \Biggl[ \frac{28}{9}  \ln{2k}-\frac{218}{27}
+ \frac{1}{k}\biggl(-\frac{4}{3}\ln^3{2k} + 3.863\ln^2{2k} - 11 \ln{2k} + 27.9 \biggr) \Biggr]$$

== Total cross section ==
One can present the total cross section per atom as a simple sum of each effects:

$$\sigma_\text{total}= \sigma_\text{ph}+\sigma_\text{C}+\sigma_\text{pair}+\sigma_\text{trip}$$

Next, using the Beer–Lambert–Bouguer law, one can calculate the linear attenuation coefficient for the photon interaction with an absorber of atomic density N:

$$\mu= \sigma_\text{total} N$$

or the mass attenuation coefficient:

$$\mu_\text{d} = \frac{\mu}{\rho} = \frac{\sigma_\text{total}}{A m_\text{u}}$$

where ρ is mass density, m_{u} is the atomic mass constant, A is the atomic mass number of the absorber.

This can be directly used in practice, e.g. in the radiation protection.

The analytical calculation of the cross section of each specific phenomenon is rather difficult because appropriate equations are long and complicated. Thus, the total cross section of gamma interaction can be presented in one phenomenological equation formulated by Fornalski, which can be used instead:

$$\sigma_\text{total} (k,Z)= \sum_{i=0}^6 \biggl[ (\ln{k})^i   \sum_{j=0}^4 a_{i,j}  Z^j \biggr] ,$$

where a_{i,j} parameters are presented in Table below. This formula is an approximation of the total cross section of gamma rays interaction with matter, for different energies (from 1 MeV to 10 GeV, namely 2 < k < 20000) and absorber's atomic numbers (from Z = 1 to 100).

a_{i,j}	i = 0	i = 1	i = 2	i = 3	i = 4	i = 5	i = 6
j = 0	0.0830899	−0.08717743	0.02610534	−2.74655×10^{−3}	4.39504∙10^{−5}	9.05605∙10^{−6}	-3.97621∙10^{−7}
j = 1	0.265283	−0.10167009	0.00701793	2.371288×10^{−3}	−5.020251×10^{−4}	3.6531×10^{−5}	−9.46044×10^{−7}
j = 2	2.18838×10^{−3}	−2.914205×10^{−3}	1.26639×10^{−3}	−7.6598×10^{−5}	−1.58882×10^{−5}	2.18716×10^{−6}	−7.49728×10^{−8}
j = 3	−4.48746×10^{−5}	4.75329×10^{−5}	−1.43471×10^{−5}	1.19661×10^{−6}	5.7891×10^{−8}	−1.2617×10^{−8}	4.633×10^{−10}
j = 4	6.29882×10^{−7}	−6.72311×10^{−7}	2.61963×10^{−7}	−5.1862×10^{−8}	5.692×10^{−9}	−3.29×10^{−10}	7.7×10^{−12}

For lower energy region (< 1 MeV) the Fornalski equation is more complicated due to the larger function variability of different elements. Therefore, the modified equation

$$\sigma_\text{total} (E,Z)= \exp \sum_{i=0}^6 \biggl[ (\ln{E})^i  \sum_{j=0}^6 a_{i,j}  Z^j \biggr]$$

is a good approximation for photon energies from 150 keV to 10 MeV, where the photon energy E is given in MeV, and a_{i,j} parameters are presented in the table below with much better precision. Analogically, the equation is valid for all Z from 1 to 100.

a_{i,j}	j = 0	j = 1	j = 2	j = 3	j = 4	j = 5	j = 6
i = 0	-1.539137959563277	0.3722271606115605	-0.018918894979230043	5.304673816064956∙10^{−4}	-7.901251450214221∙10^{−6}	5.9124040925689876∙10^{−8}	-1.7450439521037788∙10^{−10}
i = 1	-0.49013771295901015	7.366301806437177∙10^{−4}	-8.898417420107425∙10^{−5}	3.294237085781055∙10^{−6}	-8.450746169984143∙10^{−8}	7.640266479340313∙10^{−10}	-2.282367050913894∙10^{−12}
i = 2	-0.05705460622256227	0.001957234615764126	-6.187107799669643∙10^{−5}	2.1901234933548505∙10^{−6}	1.9412437622425253∙10^{−8}	-5.851534943255455∙10^{−10}	2.7073481839614158∙10^{−12}
i = 3	0.001395861376531693	-7.137867469026608∙10^{−4}	2.462958782088413∙10^{−4}	-9.660290609660555∙10^{−6}	1.295493742164346∙10^{−7}	-6.538025860945927∙10^{−10}	8.763097742806648∙10^{−13}
i = 4	5.105805426257604∙10^{−5}	0.0011420827759804927	-8.177273886356552∙10^{−5}	4.564725445290536∙10^{−6}	-9.707786695822055∙10^{−8}	8.351662725636947∙10^{−10}	-2.545941852995417∙10^{−12}
i = 5	-5.416099245465933∙10^{−4}	5.65398317844477∙10^{−4}	-5.294089702089374∙10^{−5}	5.437298837558547∙10^{−7}	1.4824427385312707∙10^{−8}	-2.8079293400520423∙10^{−10}	1.247192025425616∙10^{−12}
i = 6	3.6322794450615036∙10^{−4}	-2.186723664102979∙10^{−4}	1.739236692381265∙10^{−5}	-3.7341071277534563∙10^{−7}	1.1585158108088033∙10^{−9}	3.1805366711255584∙10^{−11}	-2.0806866173605604∙10^{−13}

== XCOM Database of cross sections ==
The US National Institute of Standards and Technology published on-line a complete and detailed database of cross section values of X-ray and gamma ray interactions with different materials in different energies. The database, called XCOM, contains also linear and mass attenuation coefficients, which are useful for practical applications.

== See also ==
- Cross section (physics)
- Gamma ray
- Linear attenuation coefficient
- Mass attenuation coefficient
- Neutron cross section
- Nuclear cross section
