= Photoionisation cross section =

Aspect of condensed matter physics

Photoionisation cross section in the context of condensed matter physics refers to the probability of a particle (usually an electron) being emitted from its electronic state.

== Cross section in photoemission ==
The photoemission is a useful experimental method for the determination and the study of the electronic states. Sometimes the small amount of deposited material over a surface has a weak contribution to the photoemission spectra, which makes its identification very difficult. The knowledge of the cross section of a material can help to detect thin layers or 1D nanowires over a substrate. A right choice of the photon energy can enhance a small amount of material deposited over a surface, otherwise the display of the different spectra won't be possible.

== See also ==
- Gamma ray cross section
- ARPES
- Synchrotron radiation
- Cross section (physics)
- Absorption cross section
- Nuclear cross section
