= Klein–Nishina formula =

Electron-photon scattering cross section

Klein–Nishina distribution of scattering-angle cross sections over a range of commonly encountered energies.

In particle physics, the Klein–Nishina formula gives the differential cross section (i.e. the "likelihood" and angular distribution) of photons scattered from a single free electron, calculated in the lowest order of quantum electrodynamics. It was first derived in 1928 by Oskar Klein and Yoshio Nishina, constituting one of the first successful applications of the Dirac equation. The formula describes both the Thomson scattering of low energy photons (e.g. visible light) and the Compton scattering of high energy photons (e.g. x-rays and gamma-rays), showing that the total cross section and expected deflection angle decrease with increasing photon energy.

In quantum field theory it is known as Klein–Nishina–Tamm formula, adding the name of Igor Tamm who derived the formula from field quantization.

== Formula ==
For an incident unpolarized photon of energy $E_\gamma$, the differential cross section is:

$$\frac{d\sigma}{d\Omega} = \frac{1}{2} r_e^2 \left(\frac{\lambda}{\lambda'}\right)^{2} \left[\frac{\lambda}{\lambda'} + \frac{\lambda'}{\lambda} - \sin^2(\theta)\right]$$

where

- $r_e$ is the classical electron radius (~2.82 fm, $r_e^2$ is about 7.94 × 10^{−30} m^{2} or 79.4 mb)
- $\lambda/\lambda'$ is the ratio of the wavelengths of the incident and scattered photons
- $\theta$ is the scattering angle (0 for an undeflected photon).

The angular dependent photon wavelength (or energy, or frequency) ratio is

$$\frac{\lambda}{\lambda'} = \frac{E_{\gamma'}}{E_\gamma} = \frac{\omega'}{\omega} = \frac{1}{1 + \epsilon(1-\cos\theta)}$$

as required by the conservation of relativistic energy and momentum (see Compton scattering). The dimensionless quantity $\epsilon = E_\gamma/m_e c^2$ expresses the energy of the incident photon in terms of the electron rest energy (~511 keV), and may also be expressed as $\epsilon = \lambda_c/\lambda$, where $\lambda_c = h/m_e c$ is the Compton wavelength of the electron (~2.42 pm). Notice that the scatter ratio $\lambda'/\lambda$ increases monotonically with the deflection angle, from $1$ (forward scattering, no energy transfer) to $1+2\epsilon$ (180 degree backscatter, maximum energy transfer).

In some cases it is convenient to express the classical electron radius in terms of the Compton wavelength: $r_e=\alpha \bar\lambda_c = \alpha \lambda_c/2\pi$, where $\alpha$ is the fine structure constant (~1/137) and $\bar\lambda_c=\hbar/m_e c$ is the reduced Compton wavelength of the electron (~0.386 pm), so that the constant in the cross section may be given as:

$$\frac{1}{2}r_e^2 = \frac{1}{2}\alpha^2\bar\lambda_c^2 = \frac{\alpha^2\lambda_c^2}{8\pi^2} = \frac{\alpha^2\hbar^2}{2m_e^2c^2}$$

== Polarized photons ==
If the incoming photon is polarized, the scattered photon is no longer isotropic with respect to the azimuthal angle. For a linearly polarized photon scattered with a free electron at rest, the differential cross section is instead given by:

$$\frac{d\sigma}{d\Omega} = \frac{1}{2} r_e^2 \left(\frac{\lambda}{\lambda'}\right)^{2} \left[\frac{\lambda}{\lambda'} + \frac{\lambda'}{\lambda} - 2 \sin^2(\theta) \cos^2 (\phi)\right]$$

where $\phi$ is the azimuthal scattering angle. Note that the unpolarized differential cross section can be obtained by averaging over $\cos^2 (\phi)$.

== Limits ==
=== Low energy ===
For low energy photons the wavelength shift becomes negligible ($\lambda/\lambda'\approx 1$) and the Klein–Nishina formula reduces to the classical Thomson expression:

$$\frac{d\sigma}{d\Omega} \approx \frac{1}{2} r_e^2  \left(1 + \cos^2(\theta)\right) \qquad (\epsilon \ll 1)$$

which is symmetrical in the scattering angle, i.e. the photon is just as likely to scatter backwards as forwards. With increasing energy this symmetry is broken and the photon becomes more likely to scatter in the forward direction.

=== High energy ===
For high energy photons it is useful to distinguish between small and large angle scattering. For large angles, where $\epsilon(1-\cos\theta) \gg 1$, the scatter ratio $\lambda'/\lambda$ is large and

$$\frac{d\sigma}{d\Omega} \approx \frac{1}{2} r_e^2 \frac{\lambda}{\lambda'} \approx \frac{1}{2} r_e^2 \frac{1}{1+\epsilon(1-\cos\theta)} \qquad (\epsilon \gg 1, \theta \gg \epsilon^{-1/2})$$

showing that the (large angle) differential cross section is inversely proportional to the photon energy.

The differential cross section has a constant peak in the forward direction:

$$\left(\frac{d\sigma}{d\Omega}\right)_{\theta=0} = r_e^2$$

independent of $\epsilon$. From the large angle analysis it follows that this peak can only extend to about $\theta_c \approx \epsilon^{-1/2}$. The forward peak is thus confined to a small solid angle of approximately $\pi\theta_c^2$, and we may conclude that the total small angle cross section decreases with $\epsilon^{-1}$.

== Total cross section ==
The differential cross section may be integrated to find the total cross section:

$$\sigma = 2 \pi r_e^2 \Biggl[ \frac{1 + \epsilon}{\epsilon^3} \Biggl( \frac{2\epsilon (1 + \epsilon)}{1 + 2\epsilon} - \ln{(1 + 2\epsilon)} \Biggr) + \frac{\ln{(1 + 2\epsilon)}}{2\epsilon} - \frac{1 + 3\epsilon}{(1  +2\epsilon)^2} \Biggr]$$

In the low-energy limit there is no energy dependence, and we recover the Thomson cross section (~66.5 fm^{2}):

$$\sigma \approx \frac{8}{3} \pi r_e^2 \qquad (E_\gamma \ll m_e c^2)$$

== History ==
The Klein–Nishina formula was derived in 1928 by Oskar Klein and Yoshio Nishina, and was one of the first results obtained from the study of quantum electrodynamics. Consideration of relativistic and quantum mechanical effects allowed development of an accurate equation for the scattering of radiation from a target electron. Before this derivation, the electron cross section had been classically derived by the British physicist and discoverer of the electron, J.J. Thomson. However, scattering experiments showed significant deviations from the results predicted by the Thomson cross section. Further scattering experiments agreed perfectly with the predictions of the Klein–Nishina formula.

In 1930, Ivar Waller and Igor Tamm published their work independently on the field quantization of Compton scattering and reproduced Klein–Nishina formula.

== See also ==
- Synchrotron radiation
- Yoshio Nishina
- Oskar Klein
