= House at 356 Albany Avenue =

Historic house in New York, United States

- U.S. National Register of Historic Places
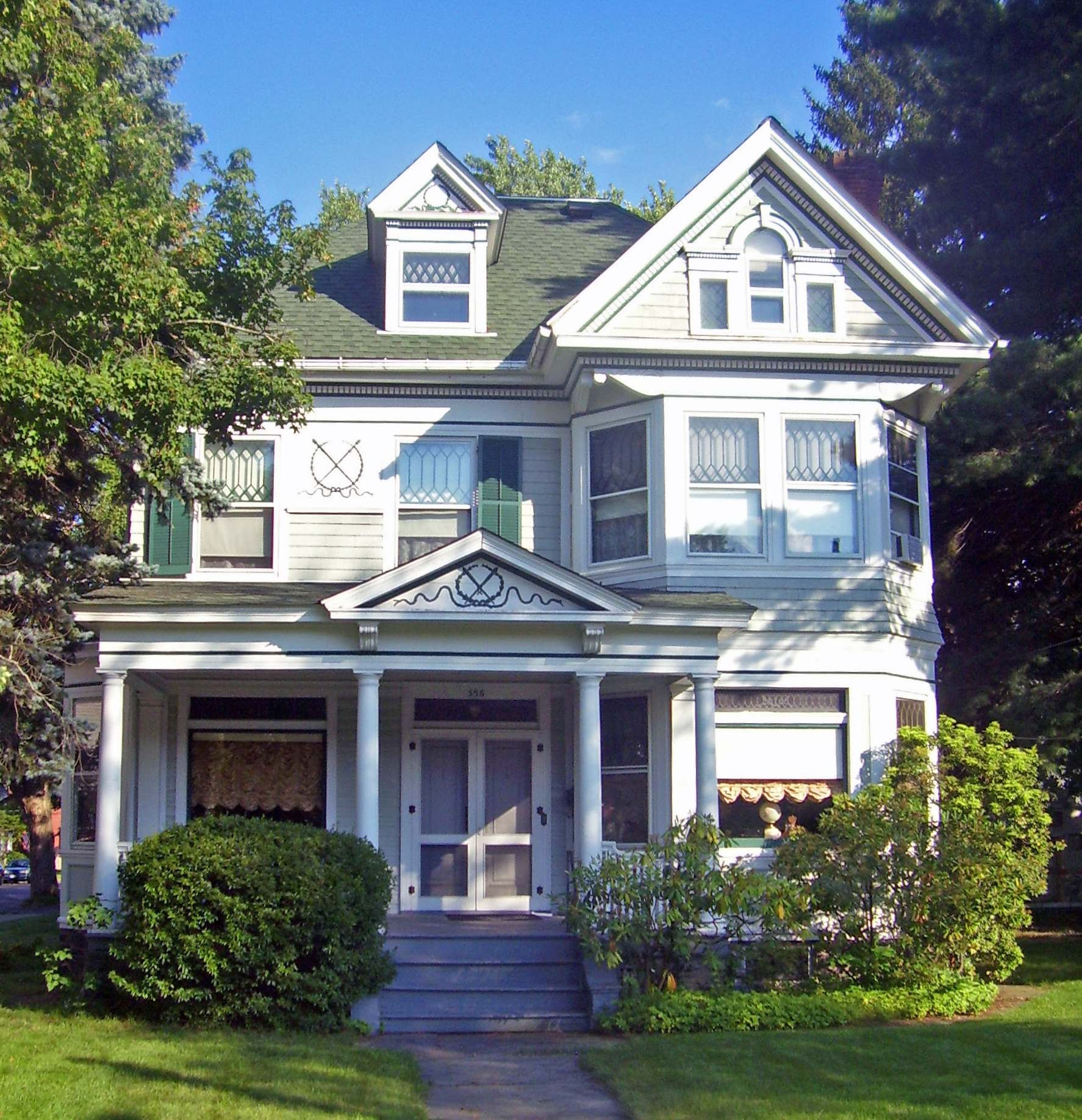
- West elevation, 2008

- Location within New York Location within the United States
- Location: Kingston, New York
- Coordinates: 41°56′18″N 74°0′9″W
- Area: less than one acre
- Built: 1897
- Architectural style: Queen Anne
- MPS: Albany Avenue, Kingston, Ulster County, New York MPS
- NRHP reference No.: 02001318
- Added to NRHP: November 15, 2002

The house at 356 Albany Avenue (NY 32) in Kingston, New York, United States is a frame house built near the end of the 19th century. It is in the Queen Anne architectural style.

Its front facade has some classically inspired ornament, dating it to the "Free Classical" phase of the Queen Anne style, a precursor to the Colonial Revival style that became popular in the early 20th century. In 2002 it was listed on the National Register of Historic Places.

== Property ==
The house is on a 50-by-125-foot (15 by 38 m) lot on the east side of the street, at the southeast corner of the Wiltwyck Avenue intersection. The neighborhood is residential.

It is a two-and-a-half-story building on a stone foundation, sided in clapboard on the first story and shingles on the second. The two stories are divided by a belt course, above which the walls flare. Above the roofline, marked by a molded cornice and denticulated cornice, is a steeply pitched hipped roof pierced by a gabled dormer window on the west (front) elevation.

The front facade has a wooden porch on its north section and a projecting bay on its southern third. Broad Doric columns support the porch's shed roof and plain entablature. An offset pedimented gable surmounts the main steps, with laurel and garland in the tympanum, echoed between the two windows above and the dormer gable. Bay windows of three and four units respectively mark the two stories on the south. Above them a projecting pedimented gable has a small Palladian window at its center.

The south profile is less decorated, with two groups of windows and a lancet on the first floor comprising its fenestration. On the east (rear) is a small single-story extension covered by a hipped roof. The north side, facing Wiltwyck Avenue, has an unusual six-panel stair light. Above it is more classical decoration, a detailed cornice with a swag-ornamented frieze. It is accompanied by a three-paneled bay window similar to the one on the south of the front elevation and a centrally located gabled dormer in the roof, as well.

At the main entrance, paneled entrance doors in a finely crafted floral motif open into a vestibule/stair hall. The stair is the one accompanying the light on the north side, and it has finely crafted balusters and paneling. The central hall is lit by the bay window to the north and a Queen Anne window on the rear. From there an archway leads to the south parlor, with parquet flooring and a period fireplace and mantel. The second floor also retains its original plan and finish, including most of the woodwork.

Behind the house is a carriage house built at the same time, now used as a garage. It is considered a contributing resource to the property's historic character and thus is included in the National Register listing.

== History and aesthetics ==
Like nearby 313 Albany Avenue, built the previous year, 356 Albany reflects the Free Classical phase of the Queen Anne style. One of the most common modes for upscale late Victorian homes, the style was an attempt to evoke the first years of the 18th century in England, when medieval buildings were updated with decorative touches. In the late 19th century, the style was typified by a complex interplay of forms and contrasts in colors and surface textures, all of which are present in 356 Albany.

In the last years of the century, architects expanded the style's ornamental vocabulary to include classical elements, such as the house's porch columns and the laurel-and-garland motif on the east facade. The use of Georgian elements, most notably the Palladian window seen both here and at 313 Albany, was another sign of the maturing style. In the U.S., these eventually led to the wider embrace of mid-18th century forms and the Colonial Revival. The original owner of the house is not known, but it was clearly someone of a socioeconomic stature that could afford to build in the most contemporary style of the day, with elaborate interior detailing (also found at 313 Albany). It has remained a private residence since its construction.

== See also ==
- National Register of Historic Places listings in Ulster County, New York
