= Mass attenuation coefficient =

Property of materials

Mass attenuation coefficients of selected isotopes for X-ray photons with energies up to 250 keV.

The mass attenuation coefficient, or mass narrow beam attenuation coefficient of a material is the attenuation coefficient normalized by the density of the material; that is, the attenuation per unit mass (rather than per unit of distance). Thus, it characterizes how easily a mass of material can be penetrated by a beam of light, sound, particles, or other energy or matter. In addition to visible light, mass attenuation coefficients can be defined for other electromagnetic radiation (such as X-rays), sound, or any other beam that can be attenuated. The SI unit of mass attenuation coefficient is the square metre per kilogram (m^{2}/kg). Other common units include cm^{2}/g (the most common unit for X-ray mass attenuation coefficients) and L⋅g^{−1}⋅cm^{−1} (sometimes used in solution chemistry). Mass extinction coefficient is an old term for this quantity.

The mass attenuation coefficient can be thought of as a variant of absorption cross section where the effective area is defined per unit mass instead of per particle.

== Mathematical definitions ==
The mass attenuation coefficient is defined as
$$\frac{\mu}{\rho_m},$$
where

- μ is the attenuation coefficient (linear attenuation coefficient);
- ρ_{m} is the mass density.

When using the mass attenuation coefficient, the Beer–Lambert law is written in alternative form as
$$I = I_0 \, e^{-(\mu/\rho_m)\lambda}$$
where
$$\lambda=\rho_m \ell$$
is the area density, also known as mass thickness, and $\ell$ is the length over which the attenuation takes place.

=== Mass absorption and scattering coefficients ===
When a narrow (collimated) beam passes through a volume, the beam will lose intensity to two processes: absorption and scattering.

The mass absorption coefficient and mass scattering coefficient are defined as
$$\frac{\mu_\mathrm{a}}{\rho_m},\quad \frac{\mu_\mathrm{s}}{\rho_m},$$
where

- μ_{a} is the absorption coefficient;
- μ_{s} is the scattering coefficient.

=== In solutions ===
In chemistry, mass attenuation coefficients are often used for a chemical species dissolved in a solution. In that case, the mass attenuation coefficient is defined by the same equation, except that the "density" is the density of only that one chemical species, and the "attenuation" is the attenuation due to only that one chemical species. The actual attenuation coefficient is computed by
$$\mu = (\mu/\rho)_1 \rho_1 + (\mu/\rho)_2 \rho_2 + \ldots,$$
where each term in the sum is the mass attenuation coefficient and density of a different component of the solution (the solvent must also be included). This is a convenient concept because the mass attenuation coefficient of a species is approximately independent of its concentration (as long as certain assumptions are fulfilled).

A closely related concept is molar absorptivity. They are quantitatively related by

(mass attenuation coefficient) × (molar mass) = (molar absorptivity).

== X-rays ==
Mass attenuation coefficient of iron with contributing sources of attenuation: coherent scattering, incoherent scattering, photoelectric absorption, and two types of pair production. The discontinuity of photoelectric absorption values are due to K-edge. Graph data came from NIST's XCOM database.

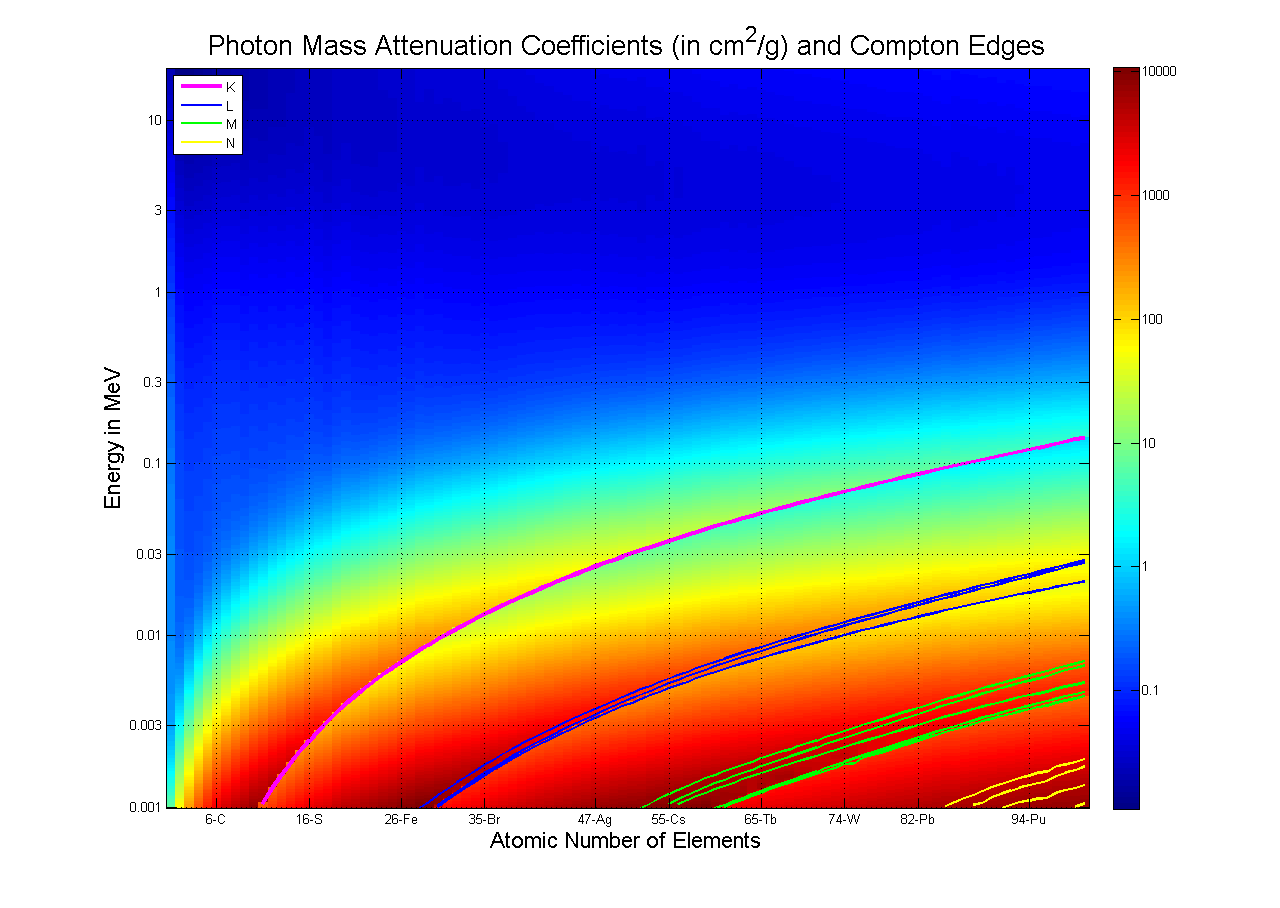
Mass attenuation coefficient values shown for all elements with atomic number Z smaller than 100 collected for photons with energies from 1 keV to 20 MeV. The discontinuities in the values are due to absorption edges which were also shown.

Tables of photon mass attenuation coefficients are essential in radiological physics, radiography (for medical and security purposes), dosimetry, diffraction, interferometry, crystallography, and other branches of physics. The photons can be in form of X-rays, gamma rays, and bremsstrahlung.

The values of mass attenuation coefficients, based on proper values of photon cross section, are dependent upon the absorption and scattering of the incident radiation caused by several different mechanisms such as

- Rayleigh scattering (coherent scattering);
- Compton scattering (incoherent scattering);
- photoelectric absorption;
- pair production, electron-positron production in the fields of the nucleus and atomic electrons.

The actual values have been thoroughly examined and are available to the general public through three databases run by National Institute of Standards and Technology (NIST):

1. XAAMDI database;
2. XCOM database;
3. FFAST database.

== Calculating the composition of a solution ==
If several known chemicals are dissolved in a single solution, the concentrations of each can be calculated using a light absorption analysis. First, the mass attenuation coefficients of each individual solute or solvent, ideally across a broad spectrum of wavelengths, must be measured or looked up. Second, the attenuation coefficient of the actual solution must be measured. Finally, using the formula

$$\mu = (\mu/\rho)_1 \rho_1 + (\mu/\rho)_2 \rho_2 + \ldots,$$

the spectrum can be fitted using ρ_{1}, ρ_{2}, … as adjustable parameters, since μ and each μ/ρ_{i} are functions of wavelength. If there are N solutes or solvents, this procedure requires at least N measured wavelengths to create a solvable system of simultaneous equations, although using more wavelengths gives more reliable data.

== See also ==
- Absorption coefficient
- Absorption cross section
- Attenuation length
- Attenuation
- Beer–Lambert law
- Cargo scanning
- Compton edge
- Compton scattering
- Cross section
- High-energy X-rays
- Mean free path
- Molar attenuation coefficient
- Propagation constant
- Radiation length
- Scattering theory
- Transmittance
