= House at 322 Albany Avenue =

Historic house in New York, United States

- U.S. National Register of Historic Places
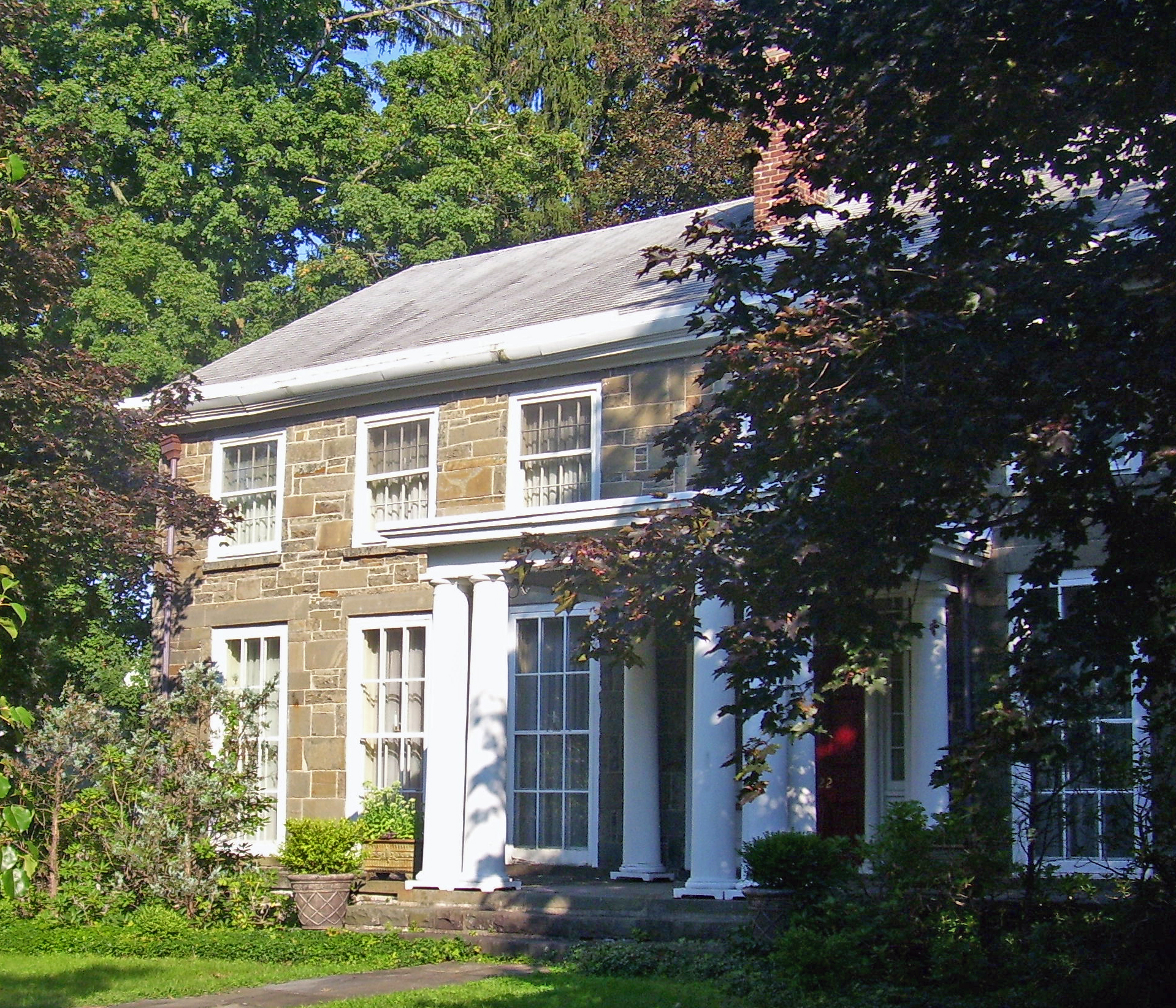
- Partial west elevation, 2008
- Location: Kingston, NY
- Coordinates: 41°56′14″N 74°0′13″W
- Area: less than one acre
- Built: early 19th century
- Architectural style: Greek Revival, Colonial Revival
- MPS: Albany Avenue, Kingston, Ulster County, New York MPS
- NRHP reference No.: 02001319
- Added to NRHP: November 15, 2002

The house at 322 Albany Avenue (NY 32), in Kingston, New York, United States, is a stone building dating to the early 19th century. In the 1840s it was renovated in the Greek Revival architectural style.

Almost a century later it was renovated again, this time in the Colonial Revival style. It was listed on the National Register of Historic Places in 2002.

== Building ==
The house occupies a large lot on the east side of Albany between Manor and Ten Broeck avenues, just opposite 313 Albany Avenue. The neighborhood is primarily residential.

It is a two-story seven-by-two-bay building with a one-and-a-half-story frame rear wing topped by a gabled roof with a heavily molded, dentilled cornice pierced by a brick chimney. In the center of the first story on the west (front) facade is a one-bay porch. Its low hipped roof is supported by pairs of Ionic columns rising to a molded cornice and entablature. There is a projecting bay window on the south profile.

The paneled main wooden door has leaded sidelights and top. It leads to a center hallway, with a large parlor on the south. This room has much Greek Revival-era decoration, such as its architraves, mantels and the newels and balusters on its staircase. The west parlor on the north side, currently used as the dining room, has similar finishes, and the northeast one has Colonial Revival elements. The upper floor and attic are also mostly original to their era of construction or renovation.

In the rear of the lot are a swimming pool, work shed, and a former garage now used as an apartment. They are non-contributing to the National Register listing.

== History ==
The house's structural origins are in the early 19th century, probably around 1820. The north gable is believed to be the most intact portion of the house from this time, due to the less refined and more weathered character of the stone there compared to the south. Due to subsequent expansions and renovations it is impossible to tell what its original plan was.

In the 1840s, its then-owner expanded it in the then-popular Greek Revival style, a common occurrence with many small older houses at that time. Much of its interior decoration was added during that construction.

Ninety years later, in the 1930s, another owner expanded the house, this time in the Colonial Revival style. The rear wing was added, new stonework was put in on the south and on the first floor a wall was removed to make a larger space of one of the parlors. The northeast parlor was also decorated in that style. The most visible Colonial Revival touch from that work is the front porch with its classically inspired columns and entablature.

At that time, the city was encouraging the restoration and preservation of its remaining colonial architecture. One of those most involved in this effort was local architect Myron Teller. It is not known whether he had anything to do with the work at 322 Albany Avenue, but the attention to detail and the quality of the work suggest his influence.

== See also ==
- National Register of Historic Places listings in Ulster County, New York
