= Absorption cross section =

Measures the probability of an absorption process

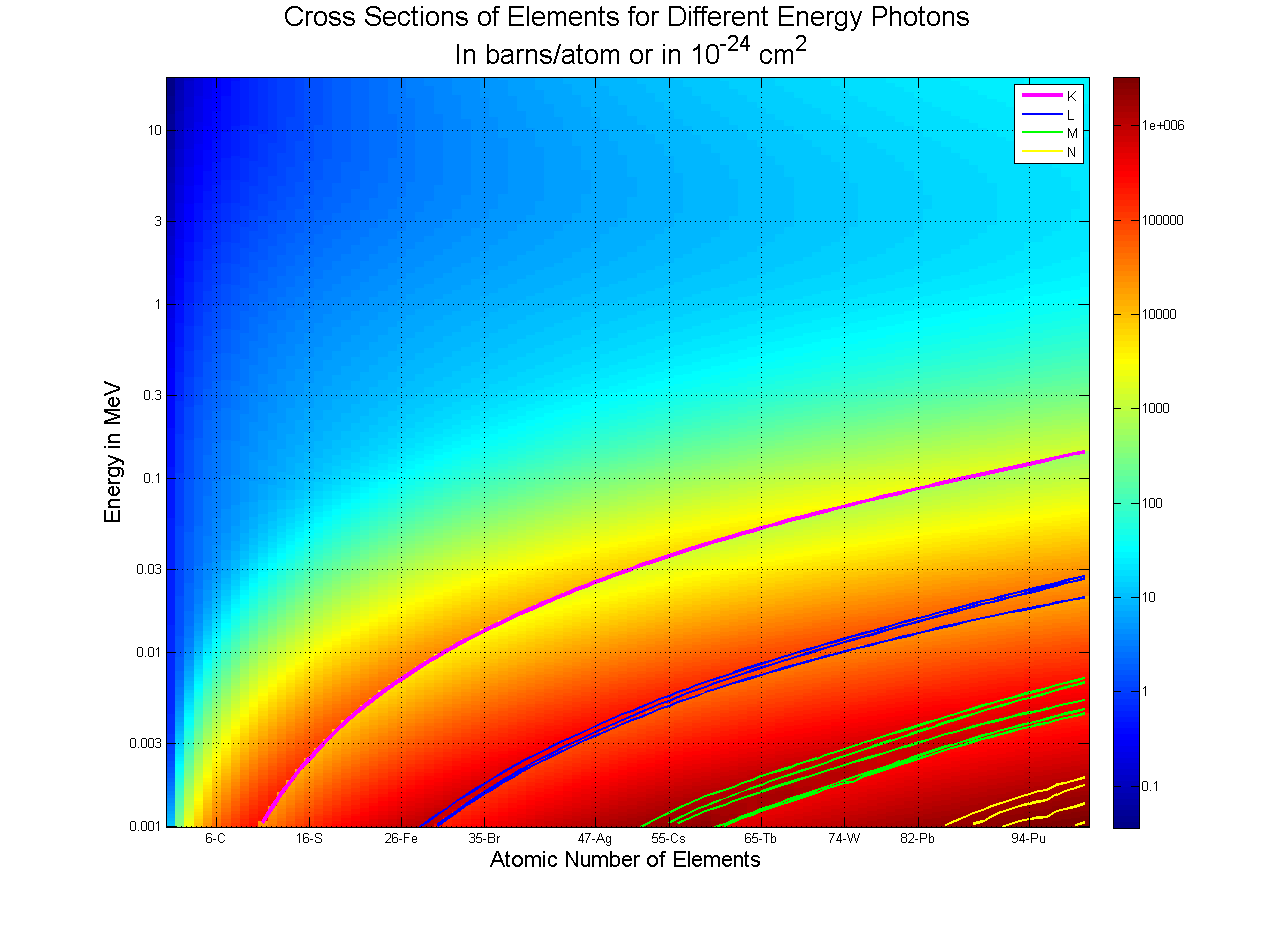
Cross sections values for all elements with atomic number Z smaller than 100 collected for photons with energies from 1 keV to 20 MeV. The discontinuities in the values are due to absorption edges which were also shown.

In physics, absorption cross section is a measure of the probability of an absorption process. More generally, the term cross section is used in physics to quantify the probability of a certain particle-particle interaction, e.g., scattering, electromagnetic absorption, etc. (Note that light in this context is described as consisting of particles, i.e., photons.) A typical absorption cross section has units of cm^{2}⋅molecule^{−1}. In honor of the fundamental contribution of Maria Goeppert Mayer to this area, the unit for the two-photon absorption cross section is named the "GM". One GM is 10^{−50} cm^{4}⋅s⋅photon^{−1}.

In the context of ozone shielding of ultraviolet light, absorption cross section is the ability of a molecule to absorb a photon of a particular wavelength and polarization. Analogously, in the context of nuclear engineering, it refers to the probability of a particle (usually a neutron) being absorbed by a nucleus. Although the units are given as an area, it does not refer to an actual size area, at least partially because the density or state of the target molecule will affect the probability of absorption. Quantitatively, the number $dN$ of photons absorbed, between the points $x$ and $x + dx$ along the path of a beam is the product of the number $N$ of photons penetrating to depth $x$ times the number $n$ of absorbing molecules per unit volume times the absorption cross section $\sigma$:

$$\frac{dN}{dx}= -N n \sigma$$.

The absorption cross section is closely related to molar absorptivity $\varepsilon$ and mass absorption coefficient.

$\sigma= \frac{\ln(10)\times 10^3}{N_\text{A}}\times \varepsilon$

For a given particle and its energy, the absorption cross section of the target material can be calculated from mass absorption coefficient using:

$$\sigma= (\mu/\rho) m_\text{a}/N_\text{A}$$

where:

- $\mu/\rho$ is the mass absorption coefficient
- $m_\text{a}$ is the molar mass in g/mol
- $N_\text{A}$ is Avogadro constant

This is also commonly expressed as:

$$\sigma= \alpha/n$$

where:

- $\alpha$ is the absorption coefficient
- $n$ is the atomic number density

== See also ==
- Cross section (physics)
- Photoionisation cross section
- Nuclear cross section
- Neutron cross section
- Mean free path
- Compton scattering
- Transmittance
- Attenuation
- Beer–Lambert law
- High energy X-rays
- Attenuation coefficient
- Absorption spectroscopy
