= Came =

Divider bar in a glass window

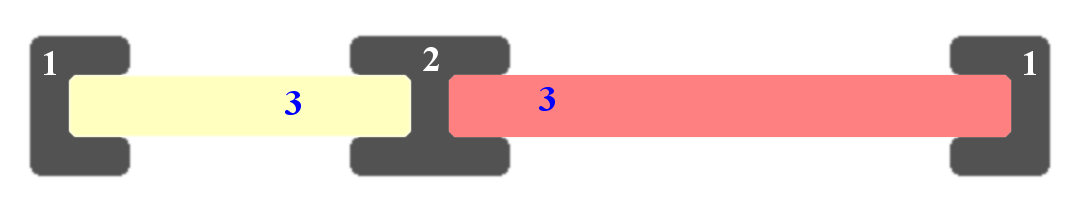
Schematic depiction of H- and U-shaped lead came cross sections, with embedded glass pieces

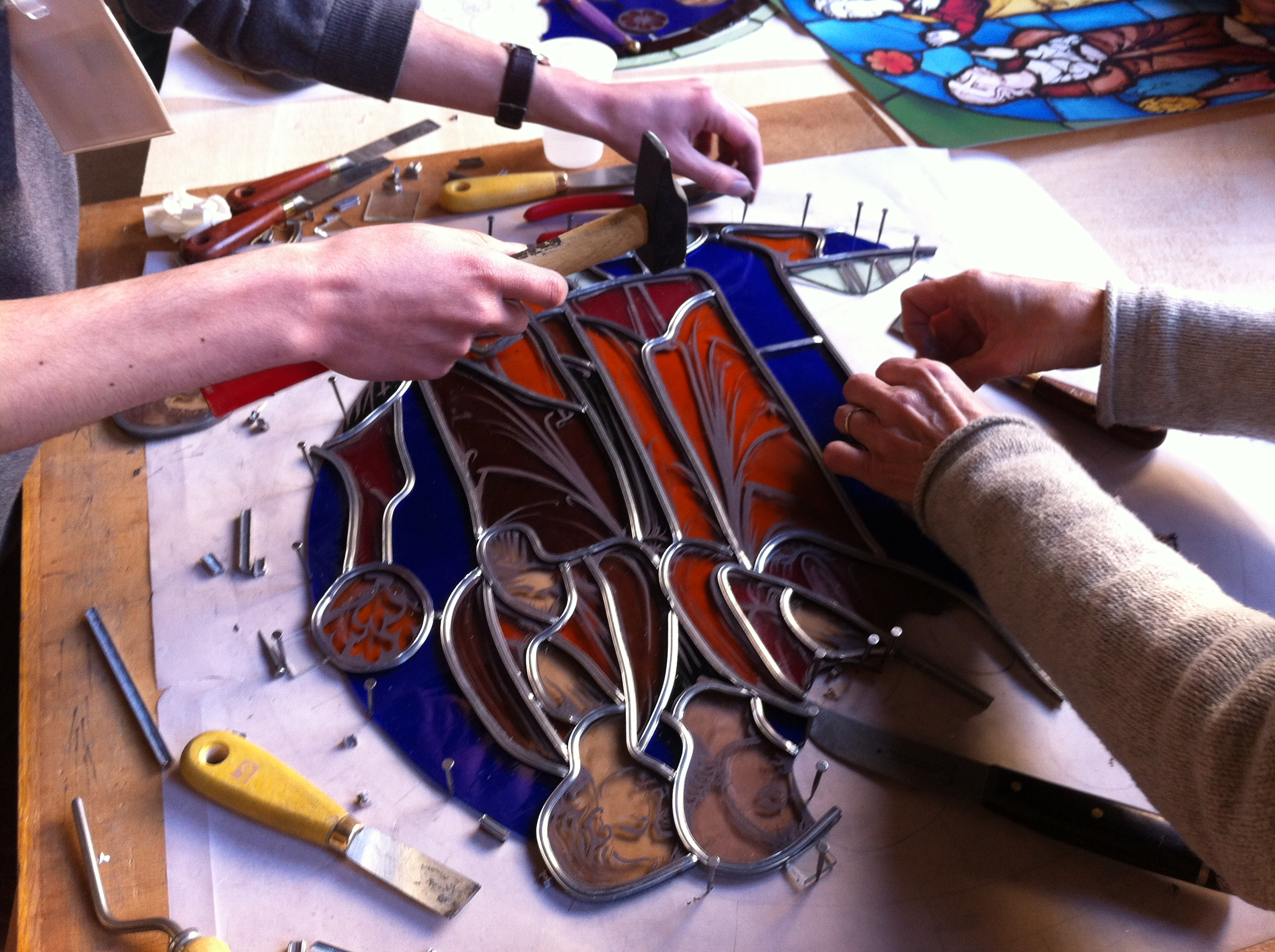
Musée de Cluny students at work in a stained glass workshop

A came is a divider bar used between small pieces of glass to make a larger glazing panel. Two types of came are fashioned: the H-shaped sections that hold two pieces together, and the U-shaped sections that are used for the borders.

Cames are usually made of lead, zinc, copper, brass, or brass-capped lead. Of the metal strips, lead is softer and more flexible, making it easier to cut and bend. The harder metals are used to work with slightly curved lines and pieces that require greater structural support. They can also be used as border came, once again for stability and support.

== Purpose ==
Came serves three purposes:

1. it joins the pieces of glass (the H-shaped channels are used to join two pieces of glass and the U-shaped are used for the border),
2. forms the lines within the glasswork and
3. provides the metal to be soldered, thus joining the pieces of came.

== Came face ==
Came comes in varying face sizes and shapes. They can be round, flat or colonial shaped strips. They can also be narrow or have wide faces.

== Came strips ==
Came strips are 4 to 6 feet in length. The came strips can be a leaf, channel or heart came:

"The leaf is the surface on either side of the came that overlaps the edges of the glass and is left exposed once the panel has been assembled. It has either a flat or rounded profile and its width is the measurement given when a came size is listed.

The channel runs the length of the came. H-shaped came has 2 back-to-back channels that hold adjoining glass pieces in position on the interior of a stained glass panel. It can also be used as a border came in certain situations. U-shaped came has only one channel and is used as a border around the perimeter of panels.

The heart is the part of the came that the glass pieces rest against inside the channel. The width of lead came pattern lines is usually 1/16 inch and allows for the thickness of the came's heart to fit between the adjoining pieces of glass."

The width and depth of the came used to assemble the piece affect the pattern for cutting glass and for creating the finished piece.

== Border cames ==
Border cames are U-channel cames that are used on the outside edges of works. The selection of the metal of the came may vary depending upon the work. For instance, zinc may be a solid selection for free-hanging panels, because it is rigid, but lightweight. Architectural panels, on the other hand, are often enclosed in framing and therefore do not require a hard metal.

== Bumpers or lead spacers ==
Bumpers, or lead spacers, are pieces of cut came strips that are left over. They can be used temporarily in the glasswork process to hold together two pieces of glass to estimate the spacing of the finished project.

== See also ==
- Mullion – Architectural element
- Muntin – Strip of wood or metal that separates and holds glass panes in a window
- Tiffany lamp – Type of lamp with colorful glass shade
