= Thomson scattering =

Low energy photon scattering off charged particles

Thomson scattering is the elastic scattering of electromagnetic radiation by a free charged particle, as described by classical electromagnetism. It is the low-energy limit of Compton scattering: the particle's kinetic energy and photon frequency do not change as a result of the scattering. This limit is valid as long as the photon energy is much smaller than the mass energy of the particle: hν ≪ mc^{2}, or equivalently, if the wavelength of the light is much greater than the Compton wavelength of the particle (e.g., for electrons, longer wavelengths than hard x-rays).

== Description ==
Thomson scattering describes the classical limit of electromagnetic radiation scattering from a free particle. An incident plane wave accelerates a charged particle which consequently emits radiation of the same frequency. The net effect is to scatter the incident radiation.

Thomson scattering is an important phenomenon in plasma physics and was first explained by the physicist J. J. Thomson. As long as the motion of the particle is non-relativistic (i.e. its speed is much less than the speed of light), the main cause of the acceleration of the particle will be due to the electric field component of the incident wave. In a first approximation, the influence of the magnetic field can be neglected. The particle will move in the direction of the oscillating electric field, resulting in electromagnetic dipole radiation. The moving particle radiates most strongly in a direction perpendicular to its acceleration and that radiation will be polarized along the direction of its motion. Therefore, depending on where an observer is located, the light scattered from a small volume element may appear to be more or less polarized.

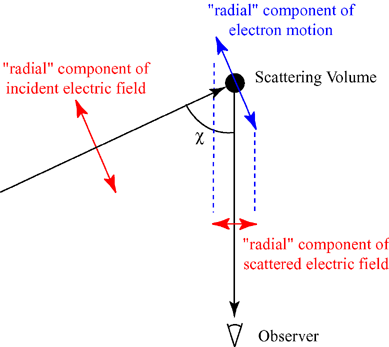
Incident photon comes from the left, with its electric field perpendicular to its path. It hits the scattering electron, which absorbs it and vibrates, matching the incident field, generating the outgoing field. The outgoing photon field matches the electron's motion, absorbs some of the energy, and exits to the bottom.

In the diagram, everything happens in the plane of the diagram. Electric fields of the incoming and outgoing wave can be divided up into perpendicular components. Those perpendicular to the plane are "tangential" and are not affected. Those components lying in the plane are referred to as "radial". The incoming and outgoing wave directions are also in the plane, and perpendicular to the electric components, as usual. (It is difficult to make these terms seem natural, but it is standard terminology.)

It can be shown that the amplitude of the outgoing wave will be proportional to the cosine of χ, the angle between the incident and scattered outgoing waves. The intensity, which is the square of the amplitude, will then be diminished by a factor of cos^{2}(χ). It can be seen that the tangential components (perpendicular to the plane of the diagram) will not be affected in this way.

The scattering is best described by an emission coefficient which is defined as ε, where ε dt dV dΩ dλ is the energy scattered by a volume element dV in time dt into solid angle dΩ between wavelengths λ and λ + dλ. From the point of view of an observer, there are two emission coefficients, ε_{r} corresponding to radially polarized light and ε_{t} corresponding to tangentially polarized light. For unpolarized incident light, these are given by:
$$\begin{align}
\varepsilon_\text{t} &= \frac{3}{16\pi} \sigma_\text{t} In \\[1ex]
\varepsilon_\text{r} &= \frac{3}{16\pi}\sigma_\text{t} In \cos^2\chi
\end{align}$$
where n is the density of charged particles at the scattering point, I is incident flux (i.e. energy/time/area/wavelength), χ is the angle between the incident and scattered photons (see figure above) and σ_{t} is the Thomson cross section for the charged particle, defined below. The total energy radiated by a volume element dV in time dt between wavelengths λ and λ + dλ is found by integrating the sum of the emission coefficients over all directions (solid angle):
$$\int\varepsilon \, d\Omega = \int_0^{2\pi} d\varphi \int_0^\pi d\chi (\varepsilon_\text{t} + \varepsilon_r) \sin \chi = I \frac{3 \sigma_\text{t}}{16\pi} n  2 \pi (2 + 2/3) = \sigma_\text{t} I n.$$

The Thomson differential cross section, related to the sum of the emissivity coefficients, is given by
$$\frac{d\sigma_\text{t}}{d\Omega} = \left(\frac{q^2}{4\pi\varepsilon_0 mc^2}\right)^2 \frac{1+\cos^2\chi} 2 ,$$
where q is the charge of the particle, m is its mass, and ε_{0} is the permittivity of free space. Integrating over the solid angle, we obtain the Thomson cross section
$$\sigma_\text{t} = \frac{8\pi} 3 \left(\frac{q^2}{4\pi\varepsilon_0 mc^2}\right)^2 = \frac{8\pi} 3 {r}^2 = \frac{8 \pi}{3} \left(\alpha \lambda\!\!\!\bar{}_\text{c}\right)^2 ,$$
where r is the particle's classical radius, $\lambda\!\!\!\bar{}_\text{c}$ is its reduced Compton wavelength, and α is the fine structure constant.

A notable feature is that the cross section is independent of the frequency of the photon.

The value of the Thomson cross-section of the electron is given by:

$\sigma_\text{e} =\frac{8 \pi} 3 \left(\frac{\alpha \hbar c}{m_\text{e} c^2}\right)^2$= 6.6524587051(62)×10^{−29} m^{2} ≈ 0.665 b.

== Examples ==
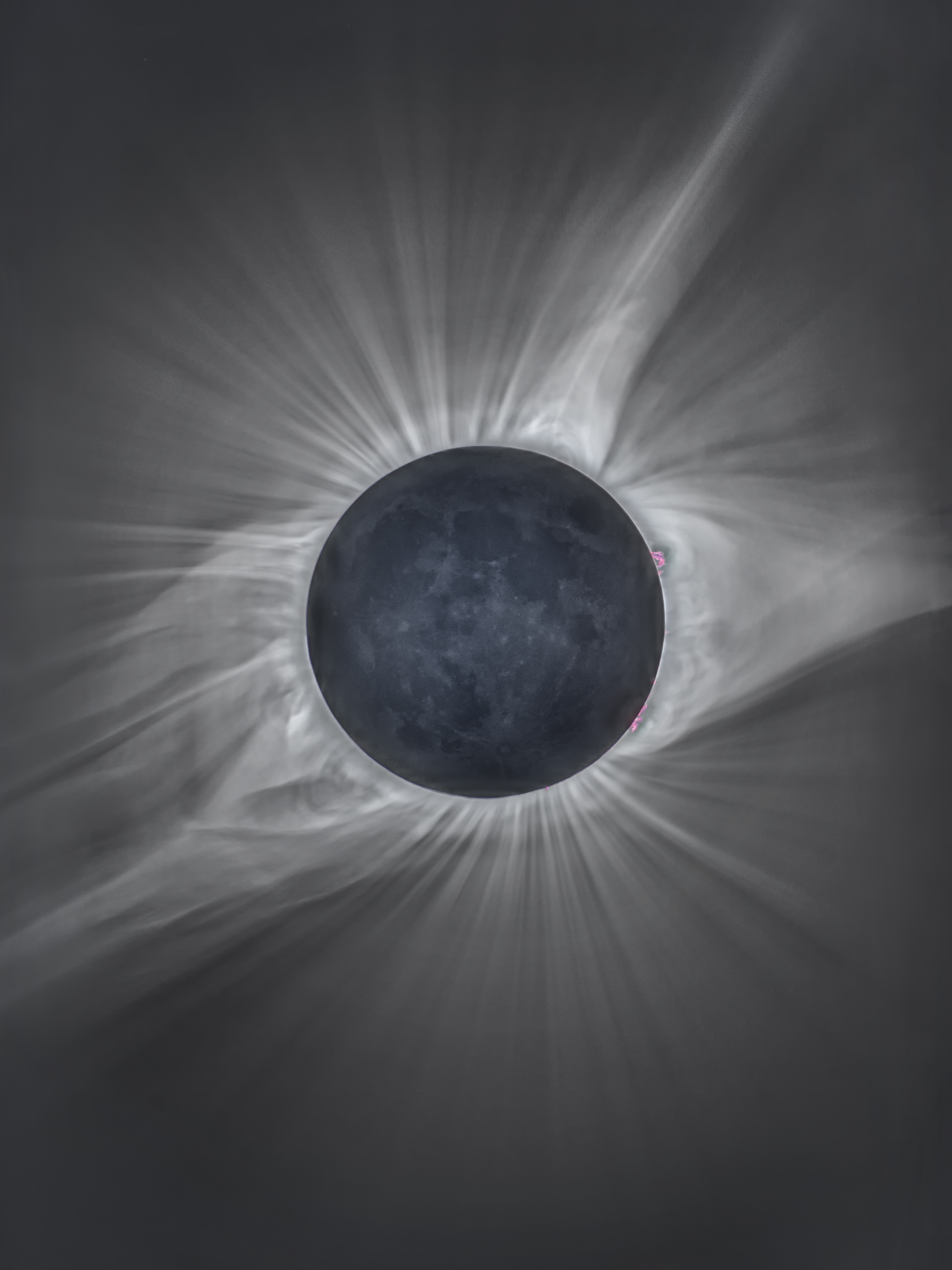
Solar K-corona observed during a solar eclipse; see for similar images.

The cosmic microwave background contains a small linearly polarized component attributed to Thomson scattering. That polarized component mapping out the so-called E-modes was first detected by DASI in 2002.

The solar K-corona is the result of the Thomson scattering of solar radiation from solar coronal electrons. The ESA and NASA SOHO mission and the NASA STEREO mission generate three-dimensional images of the electron density around the Sun by measuring this K-corona from three separate satellites.

In tokamaks, corona of ICF targets and other experimental fusion devices, the electron temperatures and densities in the plasma can be measured with high accuracy by detecting the effect of Thomson scattering of a high-intensity laser beam. An upgraded Thomson scattering system in the Wendelstein 7-X stellarator uses Nd:YAG lasers to emit multiple pulses in quick succession. The intervals within each burst can range from 2 ms to 33.3 ms, permitting up to twelve consecutive measurements. Synchronization with plasma events is made possible by a newly added trigger system that facilitates real-time analysis of transient plasma events.

In the Sunyaev–Zeldovich effect, where the photon energy is much less than the electron rest mass, the inverse-Compton scattering can be approximated as Thomson scattering in the rest frame of the electron.

Models for X-ray crystallography are based on Thomson scattering.

== See also ==
- Compton scattering
- Kapitsa–Dirac effect
- Klein–Nishina formula
