= House at 313 Albany Avenue =

Historic house in New York, United States

- U.S. National Register of Historic Places
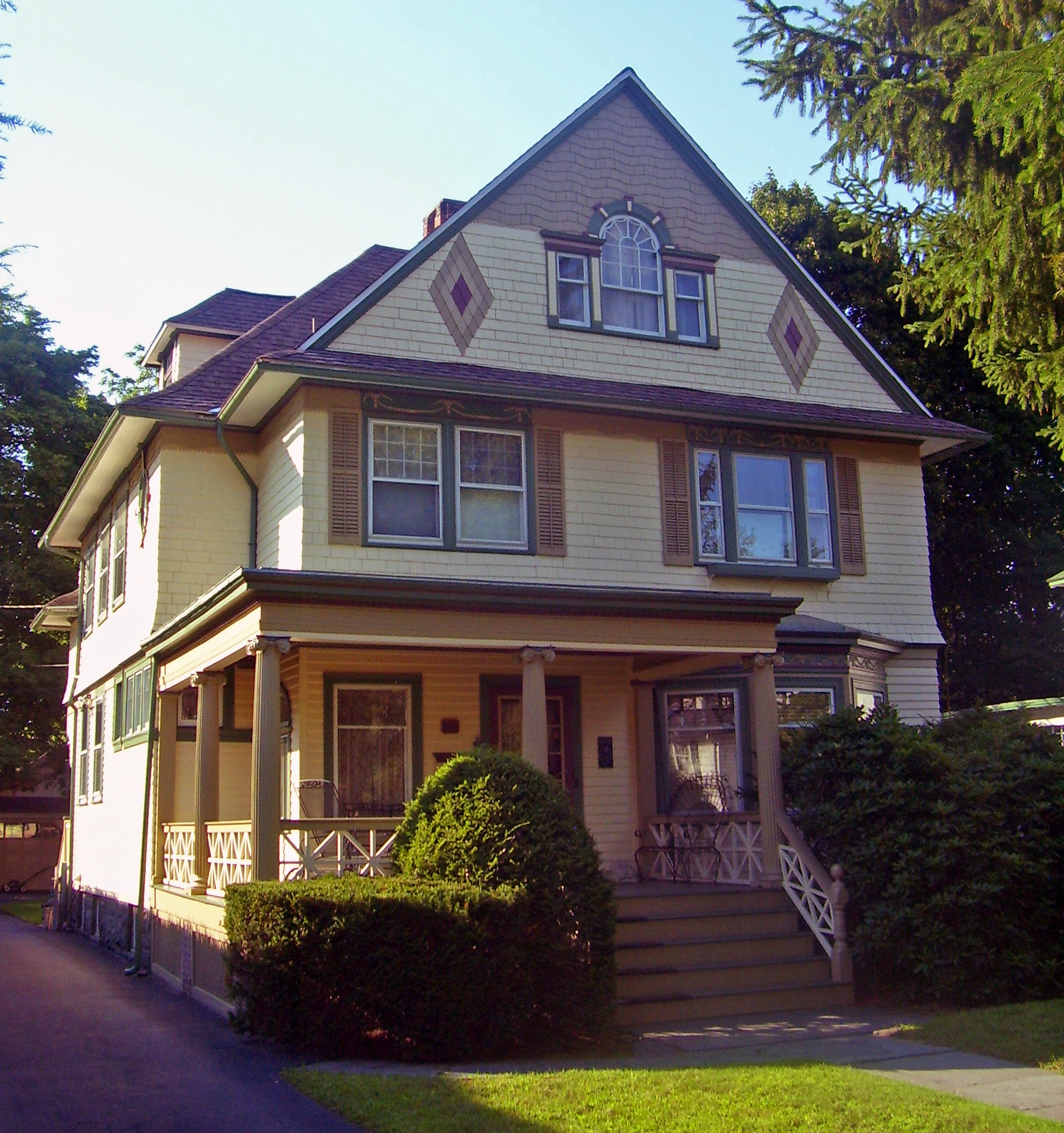

- Location within New York Location within the United States
- Location: Kingston, New York
- Coordinates: 41°56′15″N 74°0′16″W
- Area: less than one acre
- Built: 1896
- Architectural style: Queen Anne, Colonial Revival
- MPS: Albany Avenue, Kingston, Ulster County, New York MPS
- NRHP reference No.: 02001313
- Added to NRHP: November 15, 2002

The house at 313 Albany Avenue (NY 32), in Kingston, New York, United States is also known as the Hutton House. It is a frame house built near the end of the 19th century.

It is in the "Free Classical" mode of the Queen Anne architectural style, representing the period of transition from that style to the Colonial Revival style popular early in the 20th century. In 2002 it was listed on the National Register of Historic Places.

== Building ==
The house is located on the west side of the street a short distance south of the Manor Avenue intersection in a residential neighborhood north of uptown Kingston. Across the street is the stone house at 322 Albany Avenue. It is on a narrow (50 by 225 feet (15 by 69 m)) lot that backs on woodlands that buffer Esopus Creek.

It is a two-and-a-half-story structure on a stone foundation. Siding is clapboard on the first story and wood shingles on the second. Atop is a steeply pitched gable roof.

The east (front) facade has two sections. The south one has a wraparound porch with fluted Ionic columns supporting a plain entablature. On the north is a bay window with a frieze decorated in neoclassical swag.

On the second story the facade presents two sets of windows, a pair on the south and three on the north. The shingles flare slightly above a belt course. On the third story, above a pent roof, there is imbrication and a finely detailed Palladian window.

The south profile has a projecting central bay with hipped roof. Its diverse fenestration includes a band of four leaded windows and an oculus with keyed frame. On the porch side it features a three-part window with segmented arch light.

On the north is a bay window similar to the one on the east, supporting a bumpout on the story above with another three-part window. Another small porch shelters an entrance on the west, and there is an inset entry on the southwest corner.

The first floor layout is a modified side-hall plan. The main entrance opens into a vestibule with a staircase featuring finely carved balusters and polished paneling. An archway supported by columns leads into the main parlor opposite the stair. Pocket doors separate the main space from the dining room. In the southwest corner of the rear parlor is a Queen Anne fireplace and mantel. Many other finishes remain on the first floor, such as the wood molding, wall plaster, architraves and wooden parquet floor. The second story has also kept most of its original plan and finish.

A garage behind the house has many similar elements. It is of modern construction and thus non-contributing to the National Register listing.

== History and aesthetics ==
The house is recorded as having been built by a Mr. Hutton in 1896. At that time the Queen Anne style, based on the look of early 18th-century English vernacular architecture in which medieval buildings were updated with generous ornament, was maturing. Architects were beginning to add classically inspired ornaments, such as the porch columns and Palladian window on 313 Albany Avenue, to the Queen Anne vocabulary. This era, right before the turn of the 20th century, was known as the Queen Anne's "Free Classical" phase. Early in the new century this would lead to a more purely Georgian-inspired style, which eventually matured into the Colonial Revival.

Since its construction, 313 Albany Avenue has seen only one significant alteration, the removal of a wall between two parlors on the first floor during the 20th century in order to create a larger space. It has remained a private residence.

== See also ==
- National Register of Historic Places listings in Ulster County, New York
