= Classical electron radius =

Physical constant providing length scale to interatomic interactions

The classical electron radius is a combination of fundamental physical quantities that define a length scale for problems involving an electron interacting with electromagnetic radiation. A classical charged sphere producing an electric field with energy equal to the electron's rest mass energy would have a radius equal to the classical electron radius. It links the classical electrostatic self-interaction energy of a homogeneous charge distribution to the electron's rest mass energy. According to modern understanding, the electron has no internal structure, and hence no size attributable to it. Nevertheless, it is useful to define a length that characterizes electron interactions in atomic-scale problems. The CODATA value for the classical electron radius is

$r_\text{e} = \frac{1}{4\pi\varepsilon_0}\frac{e^2}{m_{\text{e}} c^2} =$ 2.8179403205(13)×10^{−15} m

where $e$ is the elementary charge, $m_{\text{e}}$ is the electron mass, $c$ is the speed of light, and $\varepsilon_0$ is the permittivity of free space. This is about three times larger than the charge radius of the proton.

The classical electron radius is sometimes known as the Lorentz radius or the Thomson scattering length. It is one of a trio of related scales of length, the other two being the Bohr radius $a_0$ and the reduced Compton wavelength of the electron $\lambda\!\!\!\bar{}_\text{e}$. Any one of these three length scales can be written in terms of any other using the fine-structure constant $\alpha$:

$$r_\text{e} = \lambda\!\!\!\bar{}_\text{e} \alpha = a_0 \alpha^2.$$

== Derivation ==
The classical electron radius length scale can be motivated by considering the energy necessary to assemble an amount of charge $q$ into a sphere of a given radius $r$, with the charge uniformly distributed throughout the volume. The electrostatic potential at a distance $r$ from a charge $q$ is

$$V(r) = \frac{1}{4\pi\varepsilon_0}\frac{q}{r} .$$

To bring an additional amount of charge $dq$ from infinity adds energy $dU$ to the system:

$$dU = V(r) dq .$$

If the sphere is assumed to have constant charge density, $\rho$, then

$q = \frac{4}{3} \pi \rho \, r^3$ and $dq = 4 \pi \rho \, r^2 dr .$

Integrating $dU$ for $r$ from zero to a final radius $r'$ yields the expression for the total energy $U$, necessary to assemble the total charge $q'$ uniformly into a sphere of radius $r'$:

$$U = \frac{3}{5} \frac{1}{4\pi\varepsilon_0} \frac{q'^2}{r'} .$$

This is called the electrostatic self-energy of the object. Interpreting the charge $q'$ as the electron charge, $-e$, and equating the total energy $U$ with the energy-equivalent of the electron's rest mass, $m_\text{e} c^2$, and solving for $r'$:

$$r' = \frac{3}{5} \frac{1}{4\pi\varepsilon_0} \frac{e^2}{m_\text{e}c^2} .$$

The numerical factor 3/5 is ignored as being specific to the special case of a uniform charge density (e.g., for a charged spherical surface this factor is 1/2, as used below). The resulting radius $r'$ adjusted to ignore this factor is then defined to be the classical electron radius, $r_\text{e}$, and one arrives at the expression given above.

Note that this derivation does not say that $r_\text{e}$ is an indication of the actual radius of an electron. It only establishes a link between electrostatic self-energy and the energy-equivalent of the rest mass of the electron, and neglects the energy in the magnetic dipole field of an electron, which if considered, leads to a substantially larger calculated radius.

The classical electron radius can also be derived as follows. Assume that the electron's charge is spread uniformly over a spherical surface. Since one part of the sphere would repel the other parts, the sphere contains electrostatic potential energy. This energy is assumed to equal the electron's rest energy, defined by special relativity ($E = m c^2$).

From electrostatics theory, the potential energy of a conducting sphere with radius $r$ and surface charge $e$ is given by

$$U = \frac{1}{2} \frac{e^2}{4\pi \varepsilon_0 r}.$$

For an electron with rest mass $m_\text{e}$, the rest energy is $U = m_\text{e} c^2$. Equating these gives

$$r = \frac{1}{2} \frac{1}{4\pi \varepsilon_0} \frac{e^2}{m_\text{e} c^2} = \frac{1}{2} r_\text{e}.$$

As in the previous case, the numerical factor 1/2 is ignored.

== Discussion ==
The cross section for scattering of x-rays from electrons is of the same order of magnitude as the classical electron radius. On the other hand, electron–electron scattering shows no deviations from Coulomb's law in measurements, even at very small distances. Consequently, electrons are considered point charges in modern theories.

The classical electron radius appears in the classical limit of modern theories as well, including non-relativistic Thomson scattering and the relativistic Klein–Nishina formula. Also, $r_\text{e}$ is roughly the length scale at which renormalization becomes important in quantum electrodynamics. That is, at short-enough distances, quantum fluctuations within the vacuum of space surrounding an electron begin to have calculable effects that have measurable consequences in atomic and particle physics.

The classical electron radius is related to the historical development of the theory of electron spin. A mechanically spinning electron with the classical electron radius and the observed angular momentum of the electron would have a tangential velocity exceeding the speed of light. This issue led Ralph Kronig to not publish his theory for fine structure of atomic spectra in 1925; George Uhlenbeck and Samuel Goudsmit published their version the same year and are credited with discovering electron spin. Modern quantum field theory is used to model electron spin.

== See also ==
- Electromagnetic mass
