= Absorption (electromagnetic radiation) =

Physical process by which matter takes up a photon's energy and stores it

An overview of absorption of electromagnetic radiation. This example shows the general principle using visible light as a specific example. A white light source—emitting light of multiple wavelengths—is focused on a sample (the pairs of complementary colors are indicated by the yellow dotted lines). Upon striking the sample, photons that match the energy gap of the molecules present (green light in this example) are absorbed, exciting the molecules. Other photons are scattered (not shown here) or transmitted unaffected; if the radiation is in the visible region (400–700 nm), the transmitted light appears as the complementary color (here red). By recording the attenuation of light for various wavelengths, an absorption spectrum can be obtained.

In physics, absorption of electromagnetic radiation is how matter (typically electrons bound in atoms) takes up a photon's energy—and so transforms electromagnetic energy into internal energy of the absorber (for example, thermal energy).

A notable effect of the absorption of electromagnetic radiation is attenuation of the radiation; attenuation is the gradual reduction of the intensity of light waves as they propagate through a medium.

Although the absorption of waves does not usually depend on their intensity (linear absorption), in certain conditions (optics) the medium's transparency changes by a factor that varies as a function of wave intensity, and saturable absorption (or nonlinear absorption) occurs.

== Quantifying absorption ==
Many approaches can potentially quantify radiation absorption, with key examples following.

- The absorption coefficient along with some closely related derived quantities
- The attenuation coefficient (NB used infrequently with meaning synonymous with "absorption coefficient")
- The Molar attenuation coefficient (also called "molar absorptivity"), which is the absorption coefficient divided by molarity (see also Beer–Lambert law)
- The mass attenuation coefficient (also called "mass extinction coefficient"), which is the absorption coefficient divided by density
- The absorption cross section and scattering cross-section, related closely to the absorption and attenuation coefficients, respectively
- "Extinction" in astronomy, which is equivalent to the attenuation coefficient
- Other measures of radiation absorption, including penetration depth and skin effect, propagation constant, attenuation constant, phase constant, and complex wavenumber, complex refractive index and extinction coefficient, complex dielectric constant, electrical resistivity and conductivity.
- Related measures, including absorbance (also called "optical density") and optical depth (also called "optical thickness")

All these quantities measure, at least to some extent, how well a medium absorbs radiation. Which among them practitioners use varies by field and technique, often due simply to the convention.

== Measuring absorption ==
The absorbance of an object quantifies how much of the incident light is absorbed by it (instead of being reflected or refracted). This may be related to other properties of the object through the Beer–Lambert law.

Precise measurements of the absorbance at many wavelengths allow the identification of a substance via absorption spectroscopy, where a sample is illuminated from one side, and the intensity of the light that exits from the sample in every direction is measured. A few examples of absorption are ultraviolet–visible spectroscopy, infrared spectroscopy, and X-ray absorption spectroscopy.

== Applications ==
Rough plot of Earth's atmospheric transmittance (or opacity) to various wavelengths of electromagnetic radiation, including visible light

Understanding and measuring the absorption of electromagnetic radiation has a variety of applications.

- In radio propagation, it is represented in non-line-of-sight propagation. For example, see computation of radio wave attenuation in the atmosphere used in satellite link design.
- In meteorology and climatology, global and local temperatures depend in part on the absorption of radiation by atmospheric gases (such as in the greenhouse effect) and land and ocean surfaces (see albedo).
- In medicine, X-rays are absorbed to different extents by different tissues (bone in particular), which is the basis for X-ray imaging.
- In chemistry and materials science, different materials and molecules absorb radiation to different extents at different frequencies, which allows for material identification.
- In optics, sunglasses, colored filters, dyes, and other such materials are designed specifically with respect to which visible wavelengths they absorb, and in what proportions they are in.
- In biology, photosynthetic organisms require that light of the appropriate wavelengths be absorbed within the active area of chloroplasts, so that the light energy can be converted into chemical energy within sugars and other molecules.
- In physics, the D-region of Earth's ionosphere is known to significantly absorb radio signals that fall within the high-frequency electromagnetic spectrum.
- In nuclear physics, absorption of nuclear radiations can be used for measuring the fluid levels, densitometry or thickness measurements.

In scientific literature is known a system of mirrors and lenses that with a laser "can enable any material to absorb all light from a wide range of angles."

== See also ==
- Absorption spectroscopy
- Albedo
- Attenuation
- Electromagnetic absorption by water
- Hydroxyl ion absorption
- Optoelectronics
- Photoelectric effect
- Photosynthesis
- Physical crystallography before X-rays
- Solar cell
- Spectral line
- Total absorption spectroscopy
- Ultraviolet-visible spectroscopy
