= Compton wavelength =

Length used in relativistic quantum physics

The Compton wavelength $\lambda_c$ of a massive particle is defined as the wavelength of a photon whose energy is the same as the rest energy of that particle. The wavelength sets the minimum space required for a free relativistic particle, and it is used as a dividing line between the combinations of mass and size that require quantum mechanics and those that can be described with classical theories.

It was introduced by Arthur Compton in 1923 in his explanation of the scattering of photons by electrons (a process known as Compton scattering). The wavelength of the outgoing photon, $\lambda'$, is shifted from the incident photon wavelength,$\lambda_0$, by an amount given by
$$\lambda'- \lambda_0 = \lambda_c(1-\cos\theta)$$
with $\lambda_c = {h}/{m c}$, where h is the Planck constant and c is the speed of light.

== Reduced Compton wavelength ==
The reduced Compton wavelength ƛ (barred lambda) of a particle is defined as its Compton wavelength divided by 2π:
$${\lambda\;\;\!\!\!\!\!\bar{}\;} = \frac{\lambda}{2 \pi} = \frac{\hbar}{m c},$$
where ħ is the reduced Planck constant. The reduced Compton wavelength is a natural representation of mass on the quantum scale and is used in equations that pertain to inertial mass, such as the Klein–Gordon and Schrödinger equations.

Equations that pertain to the wavelengths of photons interacting with mass use the non-reduced Compton wavelength. A particle of mass m has a rest energy of E = mc^{2}. The Compton wavelength for this particle is the wavelength of a photon of the same energy. For photons of frequency f, energy is given by
$$E = h f = \frac{h c}{\lambda} = m c^2,$$
which yields the Compton wavelength formula if solved for λ.

== Role in equations for massive particles ==
The inverse reduced Compton wavelength is a natural representation for mass on the quantum scale, and as such, it appears in fundamental equations of quantum mechanics. The reduced Compton wavelength appears in the relativistic Klein–Gordon equation for a free particle:
$$\mathbf{\nabla}^2\psi-\frac{1}{c^2}\frac{\partial^2}{\partial t^2}\psi = \left(\frac{m c}{\hbar} \right)^2 \psi.$$

It appears in the Dirac equation (the following is an explicitly covariant form employing the Einstein summation convention):
$$-i \gamma^\mu \partial_\mu \psi + \left( \frac{m c}{\hbar} \right) \psi = 0.$$

The reduced Compton wavelength is also present in the Schrödinger equation for an electron in a hydrogen-like atom, although this is not readily apparent in traditional representations of the equation. The following is the traditional representation of the Schrödinger equation:
$$i\hbar\frac{\partial}{\partial t}\psi=-\frac{\hbar^2}{2m}\nabla^2\psi -\frac{1}{4 \pi \epsilon_0} \frac{Ze^2}{r} \psi.$$

Dividing through by ħc and rewriting in terms of the fine-structure constant, one obtains:
$$\frac{i}{c}\frac{\partial}{\partial t}\psi=-\frac{\lambda\;\;\!\!\!\!\!\bar{}\;}{2} \nabla^2\psi - \frac{\alpha Z}{r} \psi.$$

== Table of values ==
CODATA values
Particle	Compton wavelength	Reduced Compton wavelength
electron	2.42631023538(76)×10^{−12} m	3.8615926744(12)×10^{−13} m
muon	1.173444110(26)×10^{−14} m	1.867594306(42)×10^{−15} m
tau	6.97771(47)×10^{−16} m	1.110538(75)×10^{−16} m

== Relationship to other constants ==
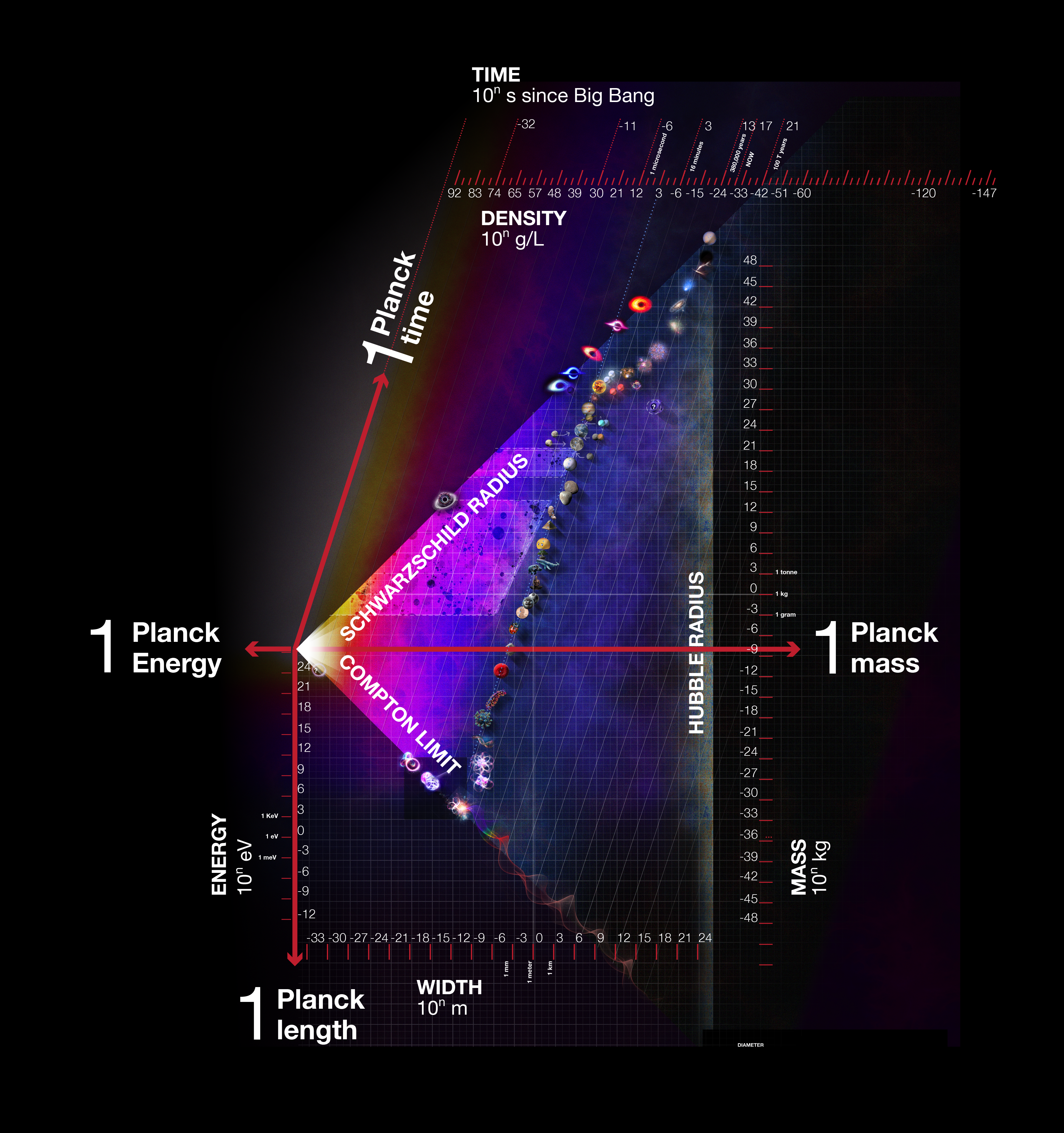
A particle whose Compton wavelength meets its Schwarzschild radius has one Planck mass, spans one Planck length, and radiates one Planck energy.

Typical atomic lengths, wave numbers, and areas in physics can be related to the reduced Compton wavelength for the electron ($\textstyle {\lambda\;\;\!\!\!\!\!\bar{}\;}_\text{e} \equiv \tfrac{\lambda_\text{e} }{2\pi}\simeq \mathrm{386~fm}$) and the electromagnetic fine-structure constant ($\alpha\simeq\tfrac{1}{137}$).

The classical electron radius is about 3 times larger than the proton radius, and is written:
$$r_\text{e} = \alpha{\lambda\;\;\!\!\!\!\!\bar{}\;}_\text{e} \simeq 2.82~\textrm{fm}$$

The Bohr radius is related to the Compton wavelength by:
$$a_0 = \frac{{\lambda\;\;\!\!\!\!\!\bar{}\;}_\text{e}}{\alpha} \simeq 5.29\times 10^4~\textrm{fm}$$

The angular wavenumber of a photon with one hartree (the atomic unit of energy $E_\text{h} = 4\pi\hbar cR_\infty$, where $R_\infty$ is the Rydberg constant), being (approximately) the negative potential energy of the electron in the hydrogen atom, and twice the energy needed to ionize it, is:
$$\frac{\hbar c}{E_\text{h}} = \frac{1}{4\pi R_\infty} = \frac{{\lambda\;\;\!\!\!\!\!\bar{}\;}_\text{e}}{\alpha^2} \simeq 7.25~\textrm{nm}$$

This yields the sequence:
$$\alpha^{-1} r_{\text{e}} = {\lambda\;\;\!\!\!\!\!\bar{}\;}_{\text{e}} = \alpha a_0 = \alpha^2 {\hbar c/E_\text{h}}.$$

For fermions, the classical (electromagnetic) radius sets the cross-section of electromagnetic interactions of a particle. For example, the cross-section for Thomson scattering of a photon from an electron is equal to
$$\sigma_\mathrm{e} = \frac{8\pi}{3}{r_\text{e}\!}^2 \simeq \mathrm{66.5~fm^2} ,$$
which is roughly the same as the cross-sectional area of an iron-56 nucleus.

== Geometrical interpretation ==
A geometrical origin of the Compton wavelength has been demonstrated using semiclassical equations describing the motion of a wavepacket. In this case, the Compton wavelength is equal to the square root of the quantum metric, a metric describing the quantum space: $\sqrt{g_{kk} } = \lambda_\mathrm{C}$.

== See also ==
- de Broglie wavelength
- Planck relation
