= Cross-sectional regression =

In statistics and econometrics, a cross-sectional regression is a type of regression in which the explained and explanatory variables are all associated with the same single period or point in time. This type of cross-sectional analysis is in contrast to a time-series regression or longitudinal regression in which the variables are considered to be associated with a sequence of points in time.

For example, in economics a regression to explain and predict money demand (how much people choose to hold in the form of the most liquid assets) could be conducted with either cross-sectional or time series data. A cross-sectional regression would have as each data point an observation on a particular individual's money holdings, income, and perhaps other variables at a single point in time, and different data points would reflect different individuals at the same point in time. In contrast, a regression using time series would have as each data point an entire economy's money holdings, income, etc. at one point in time, and different data points would be drawn on the same economy but at different points in time.

== See also ==
- Linear regression
- Regression analysis
