= Nuclear cross section =

Concept in particle physics

The nuclear cross section of a nucleus is a concept used to describe the probability that a nuclear reaction will occur. It can be quantified physically as "characteristic area", denoted as $\sigma$, where a larger $\sigma$ means a larger probability of interaction. The standard unit for $\sigma$ is the barn (10^{−28} m^{2}, 10^{−24} cm^{2} or 100 fm^{2}).

Cross sections can be measured for all possible interaction processes together, in which case they are called total cross sections, or for specific processes, distinguishing elastic scattering and inelastic scattering. For neutrons the total cross section is the sum of a scattering cross section and an absorption cross section, with fission treated as absorption by convention.

In nuclear physics it is conventional to consider the impinging particles as point particles having negligible diameter. Cross sections can be computed for any nuclear process, such as capture scattering, production of neutrons, or nuclear fusion. In many cases, the number of particles emitted or scattered in nuclear processes is not measured directly; one merely measures the attenuation produced in a parallel beam of incident particles by the interposition of a known thickness of a particular material. The cross section obtained in this way is called the total cross section and is usually denoted by a $\sigma$ or $\sigma_T.$

The radii of protons and neutrons are of the order 10^{−15} m. Assuming spherical shape of a nucleus with roughly 200 nucleons, its radius would be about 5 radii. we therefore expect the cross sections for nuclear reactions to be of the order of 100 square radii, or 10^{−28} m^{2} = 1 barn. Observed cross sections vary enormously: for example, slow neutrons absorbed by the (n, $\gamma$) reaction show a cross section much higher than 1,000 barns in some cases (cadmium-113 at 0.17 eV and xenon-135 at 0.7 eV). The cross sections for transmutations by gamma-ray absorption, by contrast, are in the region of 0.001 barn.

== Microscopic and macroscopic cross section ==
Nuclear cross sections are used in determining the nuclear reaction rate, and are governed by the reaction rate equation for a particular set of particles (usually viewed as a "beam and target" thought experiment where one particle or nucleus is the "target", which is typically at rest, and the other is treated as a "beam", which is a projectile with a given energy).

For particle interactions incident upon a thin sheet of material (ideally made of a single isotope), the nuclear reaction rate equation is written as:

$$r_x = \Phi\ \sigma_x\ \rho_A = \Phi \Sigma_x$$

where:

- $r_x$ : number of reactions of type x, units: [1/time⋅volume]
- $\Phi$ : beam flux, units: [1/area⋅time]
- $\sigma_x$ : microscopic cross section for reaction $x$, units: [area] (usually barns or cm^{2}).
- $\rho_A$ : density of atoms in the target in units of [1/volume]
- $\Sigma_x \equiv \sigma_x \ \rho_A$: macroscopic cross section [1/length]

Types of reactions frequently encountered are s: scattering, $\gamma$: radiative capture, a: absorption (radiative capture belongs to this type), f: fission, the corresponding notation for cross sections being: $\sigma_s$, $\sigma_\gamma$, $\sigma_a$, etc. A special case is the total cross section $\sigma_t$, which gives the probability of a neutron to undergo any sort of reaction ($\sigma_t = \sigma_s + \sigma_\gamma + \sigma_f + \ldots$).

Formally, the equation above defines the macroscopic cross section (for reaction x) as the proportionality constant between a particle flux incident on a (thin) piece of material and the number of reactions that occur in that material per unit volume per unit time. The distinction between macroscopic and microscopic cross section is that the former is a property of a specific lump of material (with its density), while the latter is an intrinsic property of a type of nuclei.

== See also ==
- Neutron cross section
- Scattering cross section
