= Absorptivity =

In science, absorptivity may refer to:

- Molar absorptivity, in chemistry, a measurement of how strongly a chemical species absorbs light at a given wavelength
- Absorptance, in physics, the fraction of radiation absorbed at a given wavelength
- Emissivity § Absorptivity, information on the radiometrical aspect
