= Penetration depth =

Depth that light can penetrate into a material

The penetration depth of X-rays in water as function of photon energy.

Penetration depth is a measure of how deep light or any electromagnetic radiation can penetrate into a material. It is defined as the depth at which the intensity of the radiation inside the material falls to 1/e (about 37%) of its original value at (or more properly, just beneath) the surface.

When electromagnetic radiation is incident on the surface of a material, it may be (partly) reflected from that surface and there will be a field containing energy transmitted into the material. This electromagnetic field interacts with the atoms and electrons inside the material. Depending on the nature of the material, the electromagnetic field might travel very far into the material, or may die out very quickly. For a given material, penetration depth will generally be a function of wavelength.

== Beer–Lambert law ==
According to Beer–Lambert law, the intensity of an electromagnetic wave inside a material falls off exponentially from the surface as

$$I(z) = I_0 \, e^{-\alpha z}$$

If $\delta_p$ denotes the penetration depth, we have

$$\delta_p = \frac{1}{\alpha}$$

Penetration depth is one term that describes the decay of electromagnetic waves inside of a material. The above definition refers to the depth $\delta_p$ at which the intensity or power of the field decays to 1/e of its surface value. In many contexts one is concentrating on the field quantities themselves: the electric and magnetic fields in the case of electromagnetic waves. Since the power of a wave in a particular medium is proportional to the square of a field quantity, one may speak of a penetration depth at which the magnitude of the electric (or magnetic) field has decayed to 1/e of its surface value, and at which point the power of the wave has thereby decreased to $1/e^2$ or about 13% of its surface value:

$$\delta_e = \frac{1}{\alpha/2}  = \frac{2}{\alpha}  =  2 \delta_p$$

Note that $\delta_e$ is identical to the skin depth, the latter term usually applying to metals in reference to the decay of electrical currents (which follow the decay in the electric or magnetic field due to a plane wave incident on a bulk conductor). The attenuation constant $\alpha/2$ is also identical to the (negative) real part of the propagation constant, which may also be referred to as $\alpha$ using a notation inconsistent with the above use. When referencing a source one must always be careful to note whether a number such as $\alpha$ or $\delta$ refers to the decay of the field itself, or of the intensity (power) associated with that field. It can also be ambiguous as to whether a positive number describes attenuation (reduction of the field) or gain; this is usually obvious from the context.

== Attenuation constant ==
The attenuation constant for an electromagnetic wave at normal incidence on a material is also proportional to the imaginary part of the material's refractive index n. Using the above definition of $\alpha$ (based on intensity) the following relationship holds:

$$\alpha / 2 =  \frac{1}{\delta_e}=  \frac{1}{2\delta_p}  =   \frac{\omega}{c} \; \mathrm{Im}(\tilde{n}(\omega)) =   \frac{2 \pi} {\lambda} \; \mathrm{Im}(\tilde{n}(\omega))$$

where $\tilde{n}$ denotes the complex index of refraction, $\omega$ is the radian frequency of the radiation, c is the speed of light in vacuum and $\lambda$ is the wavelength. Note that $\tilde{n}(\omega)$ is very much a function of frequency, as is its imaginary part which is often not mentioned (it is essentially zero for transparent dielectrics). The complex refractive index of metals is also infrequently mentioned but has the same significance, leading to a penetration depth (or skin depth $\delta_e$) accurately given by a formula which is valid up to microwave frequencies.

Relationships between these and other ways of specifying the decay of an electromagnetic field can be expressed by mathematical descriptions of opacity.

This is only specifying the decay of the field which may be due to absorption of the electromagnetic energy in a lossy medium or may simply describe the penetration of the field in a medium where no loss occurs (or a combination of the two). For instance, a hypothetical substance may have a complex index of refraction $\tilde{n} = 1 + .01 j$. A wave will enter that medium without significant reflection and will be totally absorbed in the medium with a penetration depth (in field strength) of $\delta_e \approx 16 \lambda$, where $\lambda$ is the vacuum wavelength. A different hypothetical material with a complex index of refraction $\tilde{n} = 0 + .01 j$ will also have a penetration depth of 16 wavelengths, however in this case the wave will be perfectly reflected from the material! No actual absorption of the radiation takes place, however the electric and magnetic fields extend well into the substance. In either case the penetration depth is found directly from the imaginary part of the material's refractive index as is detailed above.

== See also ==
- Skin effect
- Absorbance
- Attenuation coefficient
- Transmittance
