= Extinction coefficient =

Extinction coefficient refers to several different measures of the absorption of light in a medium:

- Attenuation coefficient, sometimes called "extinction coefficient" in meteorology or climatology
  - Mass extinction coefficient, how strongly a substance absorbs light at a given wavelength, per mass density
  - Molar extinction coefficient, how strongly a substance absorbs light at a given wavelength, per molar concentration
- Optical extinction coefficient, the imaginary part of the complex index of refraction

== See also ==
- For the quantitative relationship between the chemistry and physics definitions, see Mathematical descriptions of opacity
