= Standard asteroid physical characteristics =

Astronomical parameters

For most numbered asteroids, almost nothing is known apart from a few physical parameters and orbital elements. Some physical characteristics can only be estimated. The physical data is determined by making certain standard assumptions.

== Dimensions ==
For many asteroids, lightcurve analysis provides estimates of pole direction and diameter ratios. Pre-1995 estimates collected by Per Magnusson are tabulated in the PDS, with the most reliable data being the syntheses labeled in the data tables. More recent determinations for several dozens of asteroids are collected at the web page of a Finnish research group in Helsinki which is running a systematic campaign to determine poles and shape models from lightcurves.

These data can be used to obtain a better estimate of dimensions. A body's dimensions are usually given as a triaxial ellipsoid, the axes of which are listed in decreasing order as $a \times b \times c$. If we have the diameter ratios $\mu = {a \over b} \,$, $\nu = {b \over c}$ from lightcurves, and an IRAS mean diameter $d$, one sets the geometric mean of the diameters $d = (abc)^\frac{1}{3}\,\!$ for consistency, and obtains the three diameters:

$$a= d\,(\mu^2\nu)^{\frac{1}{3}}\,\!$$

$$b= d\,\left(\frac{\nu}{\mu}\right)^{\frac{1}{3}}\,\!$$

$$c= \frac{d}{(\nu^2\mu)^{\frac{1}{3}}}\,\!$$

== Mass ==
Barring detailed mass determinations, the mass $M\,$ can be estimated from the diameter and assumed density values $\rho\,$ worked out as below.

$$M = \frac{\pi abc\rho}{6}\,\!$$

Besides these estimations, masses can be obtained for the larger asteroids by solving for the perturbations they cause in each other's orbits, or when the asteroid has an orbiting companion of known orbital radius. The masses of the largest asteroids 2 Pallas, and 4 Vesta can also be obtained from perturbations of Mars. While these perturbations are tiny, they can be accurately measured from radar ranging data from the Earth to spacecraft on the surface of Mars, such as the Viking landers.

== Density ==
Apart from a few asteroids whose densities have been investigated, one has to resort to enlightened guesswork. See Carry for a summary.

For many asteroids, a value of $\rho = 2 \, \rm{g \cdot cm^{-3}}$ has been assumed.

However, density depends on the asteroid's spectral type. Krasinsky et al. gives calculations for the mean densities of C, S, and M class asteroids as 1.38, 2.71, and 5.32 g/cm^{3}. (Here "C" included Tholen classes C, D, P, T, B, G, and F, while "S" included Tholen classes S, K, Q, V, R, A, and E). Assuming these values (rather than the present ~2 g/cm^{3}) is a better guess.

== Surface gravity ==
=== Spherical body ===
For a spherical body, the gravitational acceleration at the surface $g$ is given by

$$g_{\rm spherical} = \frac{GM}{r^2}\,\!$$

where $G \approx 6.674 \times 10^{-11} \, \rm{{m^{3} \cdot s^{-2} \cdot kg^{-1}}}$ is the gravitational constant, $M$ is the mass of the body, and $r$ is its radius.

=== Irregular body ===
For irregularly shaped bodies, the surface gravity will differ appreciably with location. The above formula then is only an approximation, as the calculations become more involved. The value of $g$ at surface points closer to the center of mass is usually somewhat greater than at surface points farther out.

=== Centripetal force ===
On a rotating body, the apparent weight experienced by an object on the surface is reduced by the centripetal force, when one is away from the poles. The centripetal acceleration experienced at a latitude $\theta\,\!$ is

$$g_{\rm centrifugal} = -\left(\frac{2\pi}{T}\right)^2 r \sin\theta$$

where $T$ is the rotation period in seconds, $r$ is the equatorial radius, and $\theta \,\!$ is the latitude. Its magnitude is maximized when one is at the equator, and $\sin\theta = 1$. The negative sign indicates that it acts in the opposite direction to the gravitational acceleration $g$'.

The effective acceleration is

$$g_{\rm effective} = g_{\rm gravitational} + g_{\rm centrifugal}$$

=== Close binaries ===
If the body in question is a member of a close binary with components of comparable mass, the effect of the second body may also be non-negligible.

== Surface temperature ==
=== Mean ===
The simplest method which gives sensible results is to assume the asteroid behaves as a greybody in equilibrium with the incident solar radiation. Then, its mean temperature is obtained by equating the mean incident and radiated heat power. The total incident power is:

$$R_{\mathrm{in}} = \frac{(1-A)L_\odot \pi r^2}{4\pi a^2},$$

where $A\,\!$ is the asteroid albedo (precisely, the Bond albedo), $a\,\!$ its semi-major axis, $L_\odot \approx 3.827 \times 10^{26}\, \rm{W}$ is the solar luminosity, and $r$ the asteroid's radius. It has been assumed that: the absorptivity is $1-A$, the asteroid is spherical, it is on a circular orbit, and that the Sun's energy output is isotropic.

Using a greybody version of the Stefan–Boltzmann law, the radiated power (from the entire spherical surface of the asteroid) is:

$$R_{\mathrm{out}} = 4\pi r^2 \epsilon \sigma T^4\frac{}{},$$

where $\sigma \approx 5.67 \times 10^{-8} \, \rm{W \cdot m^{-2} \cdot K^{-4}}$ is the Stefan–Boltzmann constant, $T$ is the temperature in kelvins, and $\epsilon\,\!$is the asteroid's infra-red emissivity. Equating $R_{\mathrm{in}} = R_{\mathrm{out}}$, one obtains

$$T = {{(1 - A) L_\odot} \over {16 \pi a^2 \epsilon  \sigma  }} ^ {1 \over 4}$$

The standard value of $\epsilon = 0.9$, estimated from detailed observations of a few of the large asteroids is used.

While this method gives a fairly good estimate of the average surface temperature, the local temperature varies greatly, as is typical for bodies without atmospheres.

=== Maximum ===
A rough estimate of the maximum temperature can be obtained by assuming that when the Sun is overhead, the surface is in thermal equilibrium with the instantaneous solar radiation. This gives an average "sub-solar" temperature of

$$T_{ss} = \sqrt{2}T$$

where $T$ is the average temperature calculated as above.

At perihelion, the radiation is maximised, and

$$T_{ss}^{\rm max} = \sqrt{\frac{2}{1-e}}\  T$$

where $e\,\!$ is the eccentricity of the orbit.

=== Temperature measurements and regular temperature variations ===
Infra-red observations are commonly combined with albedo to measure the temperature more directly. For example, L.F. Lim et al. does this for 29 asteroids. These measurements are contingent for a particular day of observation. and the asteroid's surface temperature will change in a regular way depending on its distance from the Sun. From the Stefan-Boltzmann calculation above,

$$T = \frac{c}{\sqrt{d}}$$

where $d\,\!$ is the distance from the Sun on any particular day, and $c\,\!$ is a constant. If the day of the relevant observations is known, the distance from the Sun on that day can be obtained from sources such as the NASA orbit calculator, and corresponding temperature estimates at perihelion, aphelion, etc. can be derived from the above. expression

=== Albedo inaccuracy problem ===
There is a snag when using these expressions to estimate the temperature of a particular asteroid. The calculation requires the Bond albedo $A$ (the proportion of total incoming power reflected, taking into account all directions), while the IRAS and MSX albedo data that is available for asteroids gives only the geometric albedo $p$ which characterises only the strength of light reflected back to the source (the Sun).

While these two albedos are correlated, the numerical factor between them depends in a very nontrivial way on the surface properties. Actual measurements of Bond albedo are not forthcoming for most asteroids because they require measurements from high phase angles that can only be acquired by spacecraft that pass near or beyond the asteroid belt. Some complicated modelling of surface and thermal properties can lead to estimates of the Bond albedo given the geometric one, but this is beyond the scope of a quick estimate. It can be obtained for some asteroids from scientific publications.

For want of a better alternative for most asteroids, the best that can be done is to assume that the two albedos are equal, while keeping in mind the inherent inaccuracy present in the resulting temperature values.

The table shows that for bodies in the asteroid albedo range, the typical difference between Bond and geometric albedo is 20% or less, with either quantity capable of being larger. Since the calculated temperature varies as $(1 - A)^{1\over 4}$, the dependence is fairly weak for typical asteroid $A \approx p$ values of 0.05−0.3.

The typical inaccuracy in calculated temperature from this source alone is found to be about 2%. This translates to an uncertainty of about ±5 K for maximum temperatures.

== Data and derived parameters ==
Data from the IRAS minor planet survey or the Midcourse Space Experiment (MSX) minor planet survey is the usual source of the diameter.

Rotation period is usually taken from lightcurve parameters at the PDS. Spectral class is usually taken from the Tholen classification at the PDS. Absolute magnitude is usually given by the IRAS minor planet survey or the MSX minor planet survey. Astronomical albedos are usually given by either the IRAS or MSX minor planet surveys. These are geometric albedos. Often, if there is no survey data, a rough average of 0.1 may be used.

For surface gravity $g$ and radius $r$ of a spherically symmetric body, the escape velocity is:

$$v_e = \sqrt{\frac{2GM}{r}}$$

Some other information for large numbers of asteroids can be found at the Planetary Data System Small Bodies Node. Up-to-date information on pole orientation of several dozen asteroids is provided by Doc. Mikko Kaasalainen, and can be used to determine axial tilt.
