= Reflectance =

Capacity of an object to reflect light

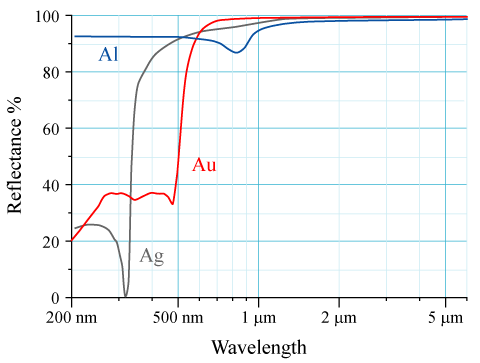
Spectral reflectance curves for aluminium (Al), silver (Ag), and gold (Au) metal mirrors at normal incidence

The reflectance of the surface of a material is its effectiveness in reflecting radiant energy. It is the fraction of incident electromagnetic power that is reflected at the boundary. Reflectance is a component of the response of the electronic structure of the material to the electromagnetic field of light, and is in general a function of the frequency, or wavelength, of the light, its polarization, and the angle of incidence. The dependence of reflectance on the wavelength is called a reflectance spectrum or spectral reflectance curve.

== Mathematical definitions ==
=== Hemispherical reflectance ===
The hemispherical reflectance of a surface, denoted R, is defined as
$$R = \frac{\Phi_\mathrm{e}^\mathrm{r}}{\Phi_\mathrm{e}^\mathrm{i}},$$
where Φ_{e}^{r} is the radiant flux reflected by that surface and Φ_{e}^{i} is the radiant flux received by that surface.

=== Spectral hemispherical reflectance ===
The spectral hemispherical reflectance in frequency and spectral hemispherical reflectance in wavelength of a surface, denoted R_{ν} and R_{λ} respectively, are defined as
$$R_\nu = \frac{\Phi_{\mathrm{e},\nu}^\mathrm{r}}{\Phi_{\mathrm{e},\nu}^\mathrm{i}},$$
$$R_\lambda = \frac{\Phi_{\mathrm{e},\lambda}^\mathrm{r}}{\Phi_{\mathrm{e},\lambda}^\mathrm{i}},$$
where

- Φ_{e,ν}^{r} is the spectral radiant flux in frequency reflected by that surface;
- Φ_{e,ν}^{i} is the spectral radiant flux in frequency received by that surface;
- Φ_{e,λ}^{r} is the spectral radiant flux in wavelength reflected by that surface;
- Φ_{e,λ}^{i} is the spectral radiant flux in wavelength received by that surface.

=== Directional reflectance ===
The directional reflectance of a surface, denoted R_{Ω}, is defined as
$$R_\Omega = \frac{L_{\mathrm{e},\Omega}^\mathrm{r}}{L_{\mathrm{e},\Omega}^\mathrm{i}},$$
where

- L_{e,Ω}^{r} is the radiance reflected by that surface;
- L_{e,Ω}^{i} is the radiance received by that surface.

This depends on both the reflected direction and the incoming direction. In other words, it has a value for every combination of incoming and outgoing directions. It is related to the bidirectional reflectance distribution function and its upper limit is 1. Another measure of reflectance, depending only on the outgoing direction, is I/F, where I is the radiance reflected in a given direction and F is the incoming radiance averaged over all directions, in other words, the total flux of radiation hitting the surface per unit area, divided by π. This can be greater than 1 for a glossy surface illuminated by a source such as the sun, with the reflectance measured in the direction of maximum radiance (see also Seeliger effect).

=== Spectral directional reflectance ===
The spectral directional reflectance in frequency and spectral directional reflectance in wavelength of a surface, denoted R_{Ω,ν} and R_{Ω,λ} respectively, are defined as
$$R_{\Omega,\nu} = \frac{L_{\mathrm{e},\Omega,\nu}^\mathrm{r}}{L_{\mathrm{e},\Omega,\nu}^\mathrm{i}},$$
$$R_{\Omega,\lambda} = \frac{L_{\mathrm{e},\Omega,\lambda}^\mathrm{r}}{L_{\mathrm{e},\Omega,\lambda}^\mathrm{i}},$$
where

- L_{e,Ω,ν}^{r} is the spectral radiance in frequency reflected by that surface;
- L_{e,Ω,ν}^{i} is the spectral radiance received by that surface;
- L_{e,Ω,λ}^{r} is the spectral radiance in wavelength reflected by that surface;
- L_{e,Ω,λ}^{i} is the spectral radiance in wavelength received by that surface.

Again, one can also define a value of I/F (see above) for a given wavelength.

== Reflectivity ==
Fresnel reflection coefficients for a boundary surface between air and a variable material in dependence of the complex refractive index and the angle of incidence

For homogeneous and semi-infinite (see halfspace) materials, reflectivity is the same as reflectance. Reflectivity is the square of the magnitude of the Fresnel reflection coefficient, which is the ratio of the reflected to incident electric field; as such the reflection coefficient can be expressed as a complex number as determined by the Fresnel equations for a single layer, whereas the reflectance is always a positive real number.

For layered and finite media, according to the CIE, reflectivity is distinguished from reflectance by the fact that reflectivity is a value that applies to thick reflecting objects. When reflection occurs from thin layers of material, internal reflection effects can cause the reflectance to vary with surface thickness. Reflectivity is the limit value of reflectance as the sample becomes thick; it is the intrinsic reflectance of the surface, hence irrespective of other parameters such as the reflectance of the rear surface. Another way to interpret this is that the reflectance is the fraction of electromagnetic power reflected from a specific sample, while reflectivity is a property of the material itself, which would be measured on a perfect machine if the material filled half of all space.

== Surface type ==
Given that reflectance is a directional property, most surfaces can be divided into those that give specular reflection and those that give diffuse reflection.

For specular surfaces, such as glass or polished metal, reflectance is nearly zero at all angles except at the appropriate reflected angle; that is the same angle with respect to the surface normal in the plane of incidence, but on the opposing side. When the radiation is incident normal to the surface, it is reflected back into the same direction.

For diffuse surfaces, such as matte white paint, reflectance is uniform; radiation is reflected in all angles equally or near-equally. Such surfaces are said to be Lambertian.

Most practical objects exhibit a combination of diffuse and specular reflective properties.

=== Liquid reflectance ===
Reflectance of smooth water at 20 °C (refractive index 1.333)

Reflection of light occurs at a boundary at which the index of refraction changes. Specular reflection is calculated by the Fresnel equations. Fresnel reflection is directional and therefore does not contribute significantly to albedo which primarily diffuses reflection.

A liquid surface may be wavy. Reflectance may be adjusted to account for waviness.

== Grating efficiency ==
The generalization of reflectance to a diffraction grating, which disperses light by wavelength, is called diffraction efficiency.

== Other radiometric coefficients ==
Radiometry coefficients
Quantity		SI units	Notes
Name	Sym.	SI units	Notes
Hemispherical emissivity	ε	—N/a	Radiant exitance of a surface, divided by that of a black body at the same temperature as that surface.
Spectral hemispherical emissivity	ε_{ν} ε_{λ}	—N/a	Spectral exitance of a surface, divided by that of a black body at the same temperature as that surface.
Directional emissivity	ε_{Ω}	—N/a	Radiance emitted by a surface, divided by that emitted by a black body at the same temperature as that surface.
Spectral directional emissivity	ε_{Ω,ν} ε_{Ω,λ}	—N/a	Spectral radiance emitted by a surface, divided by that of a black body at the same temperature as that surface.
Hemispherical absorptance	A	—N/a	Radiant flux absorbed by a surface, divided by that received by that surface. This should not be confused with "absorbance".
Spectral hemispherical absorptance	A_{ν} A_{λ}	—N/a	Spectral flux absorbed by a surface, divided by that received by that surface. This should not be confused with "spectral absorbance".
Directional absorptance	A_{Ω}	—N/a	Radiance absorbed by a surface, divided by the radiance incident onto that surface. This should not be confused with "absorbance".
Spectral directional absorptance	A_{Ω,ν} A_{Ω,λ}	—N/a	Spectral radiance absorbed by a surface, divided by the spectral radiance incident onto that surface. This should not be confused with "spectral absorbance".
Hemispherical reflectance	R	—N/a	Radiant flux reflected by a surface, divided by that received by that surface.
Spectral hemispherical reflectance	R_{ν} R_{λ}	—N/a	Spectral flux reflected by a surface, divided by that received by that surface.
Directional reflectance	R_{Ω}	—N/a	Radiance reflected by a surface, divided by that received by that surface.
Spectral directional reflectance	R_{Ω,ν} R_{Ω,λ}	—N/a	Spectral radiance reflected by a surface, divided by that received by that surface.
Hemispherical transmittance	T	—N/a	Radiant flux transmitted by a surface, divided by that received by that surface.
Spectral hemispherical transmittance	T_{ν} T_{λ}	—N/a	Spectral flux transmitted by a surface, divided by that received by that surface.
Directional transmittance	T_{Ω}	—N/a	Radiance transmitted by a surface, divided by that received by that surface.
Spectral directional transmittance	T_{Ω,ν} T_{Ω,λ}	—N/a	Spectral radiance transmitted by a surface, divided by that received by that surface.
Hemispherical attenuation coefficient	μ	m^{−1}	Radiant flux absorbed and scattered by a volume per unit length, divided by that received by that volume.
Spectral hemispherical attenuation coefficient	μ_{ν} μ_{λ}	m^{−1}	Spectral radiant flux absorbed and scattered by a volume per unit length, divided by that received by that volume.
Directional attenuation coefficient	μ_{Ω}	m^{−1}	Radiance absorbed and scattered by a volume per unit length, divided by that received by that volume.
Spectral directional attenuation coefficient	μ_{Ω,ν} μ_{Ω,λ}	m^{−1}	Spectral radiance absorbed and scattered by a volume per unit length, divided by that received by that volume.

== See also ==
- Bidirectional reflectance distribution function
- Colorimetry
- Emissivity
- Lambert's cosine law
- Transmittance
- Sun path
- Light Reflectance Value
- Albedo
- Reststrahlen effect
- Lyddane–Sachs–Teller relation
