= Leslie cube =

Radiometric device

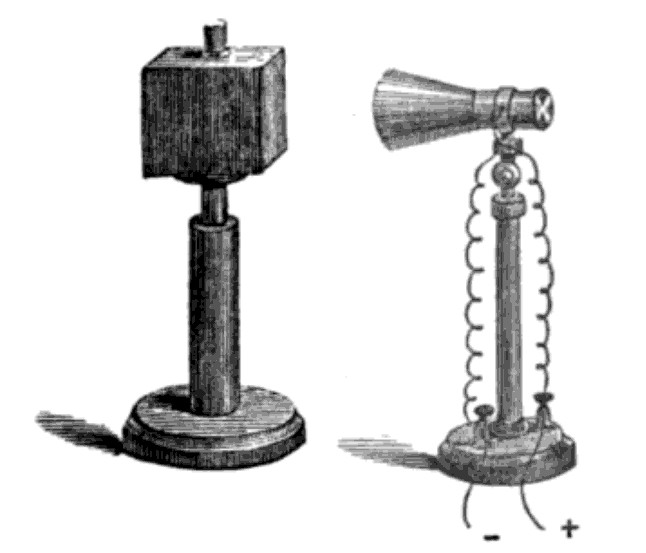
A Leslie cube (left) and a thermal detector (right)

A Leslie cube, or Leslie's cube, is a device used in the measurement or demonstration of the variations in thermal radiation emitted from different surfaces at the same temperature. It is composed of a cube filled with water with different coatings in each surfaces. It demonstrated the different emissivities of different materials.

== Device ==
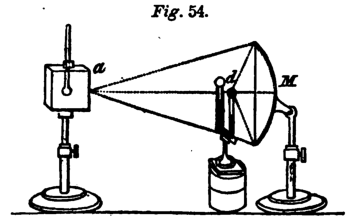
Draper's 1861 description of the Leslie cube

=== The cube ===
The Leslie cube was devised in 1804 by John Leslie (1766–1832), a Scottish mathematician and physicist. In the version of the experiment described by John Tyndall in the late 1800s, one of the cube's vertical sides is coated with a layer of gold, another with a layer of silver, a third with a layer of copper, and the fourth with a varnish of isinglass. The cube is made from a solid block of metal with a central cavity. In use, the cavity is filled with hot water; the entire cube has essentially the same temperature as the water.

=== Mirror and detector ===
Leslie added a concave mirror next to the cube to focus radiant heat into a thermometer. He used a differential thermometer consisting of a U-shaped capillary tube, with one arm having a very narrow and the other a wider. At each end of the tube were identical sealed glass bulbs filled with air, forming a closed system. The capillaries were filled with sulfuric acid tinted with carmine. When one bulb received more radiant heat than the other, the liquid column in the capillary moved, with the displacement reflecting the temperature difference between the two bulbs. To measure radiant heat, the instrument was placed so that one bulb was located at the focal point of a concave mirror.

== Modern explanation ==
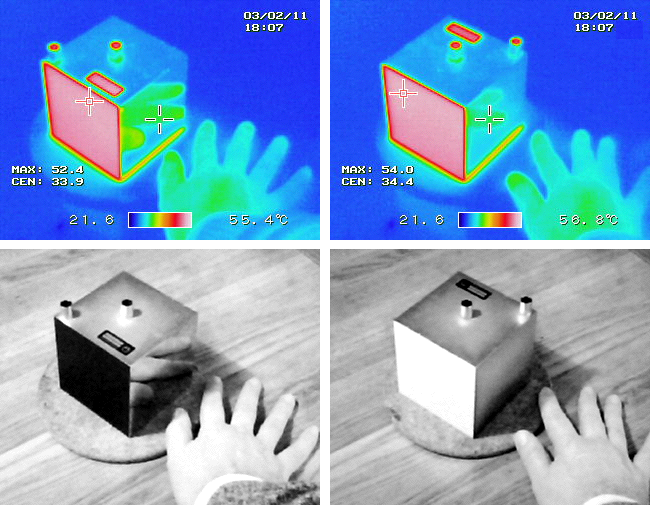
The upper images of Leslie's cube (in color) are thermographs generated by an infrared camera; the black and white images underneath are photographs taken with an ordinary camera. The face of the cube that has been painted black emits thermal radiation strongly. The polished face of the aluminum cube emits much more weakly, and the reflected image of the warm hand is clear.

In contemporary terms, the emissivities of shiny metals are low. Isinglass is an organic glue and has a much greater emissivity than the metals. Leslie's cube is still in use to demonstrate and measure the variations in emissivities for different materials. In the figure, the false color images (thermographs) of a cube at about 55 °C were taken with an infrared camera; the black and white photographs are taken with an ordinary camera. The black face of the cube is highly emissive, as indicated by the reddish color of the thermograph. The mirror-like, polished face of the aluminum cube emits thermal radiation weakly, as indicated by the blue color. The reflection of the experimenter's hand is green, which corresponds to a high-emissivity surface near body temperature (37 °C). The photographs also show that the white painted surface is nearly as emissive as a black surface.

== Legacy ==
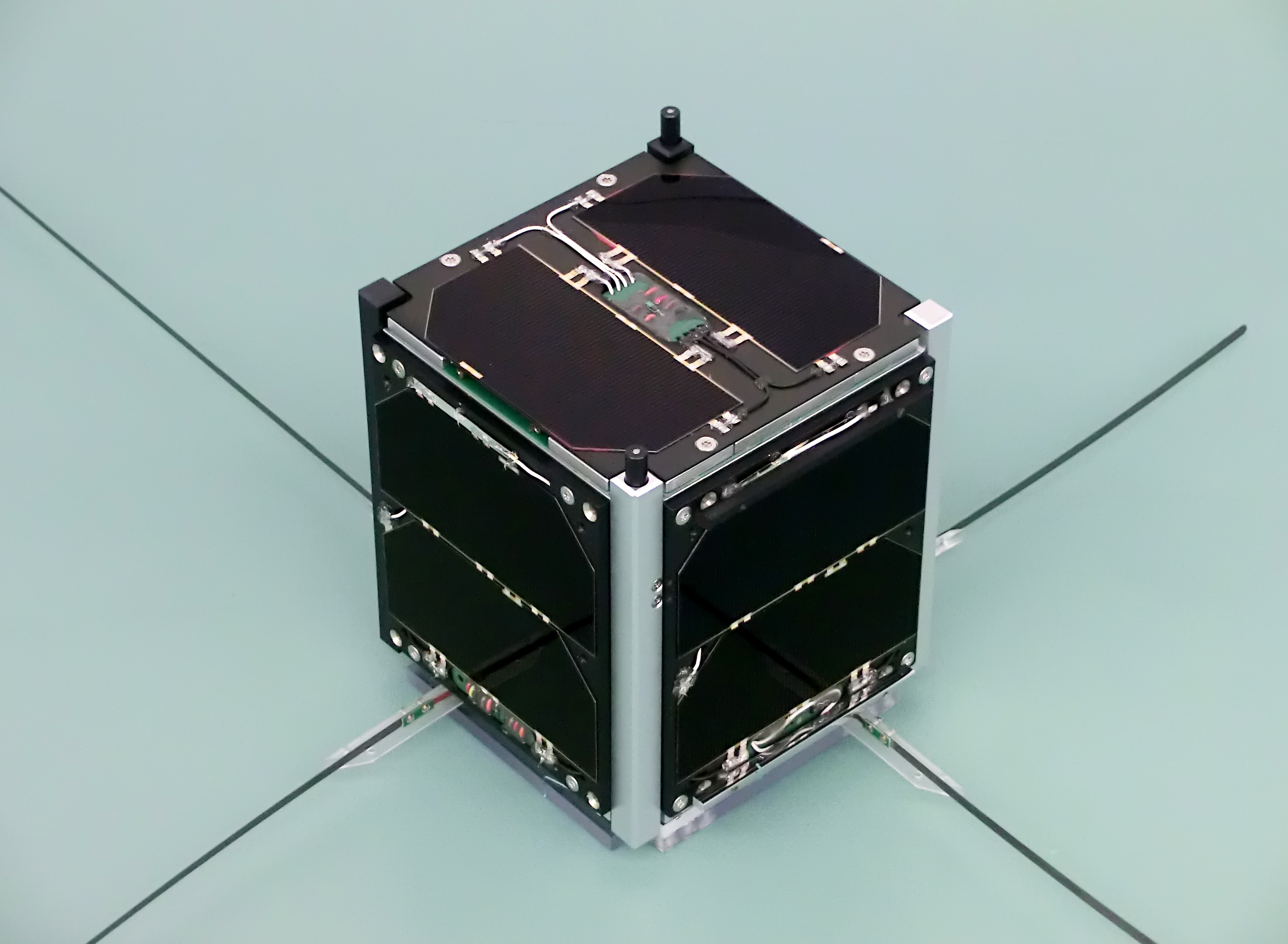
FUNcube-1 in the cleanroom before launch

A modern version of Leslie's cube is part of the structure of a small earth-orbiting satellite known as FUNcube-1 and registered as a Dutch spacecraft. Launched in November 2013, it demonstrates the absorption and emission of solar radiation in space as the satellite orbits in full sunlight and eclipse and rotates around its three axes.

== See also ==
- Blackbody radiation
- Emissivity
