= Light reflectance value =

Material property value

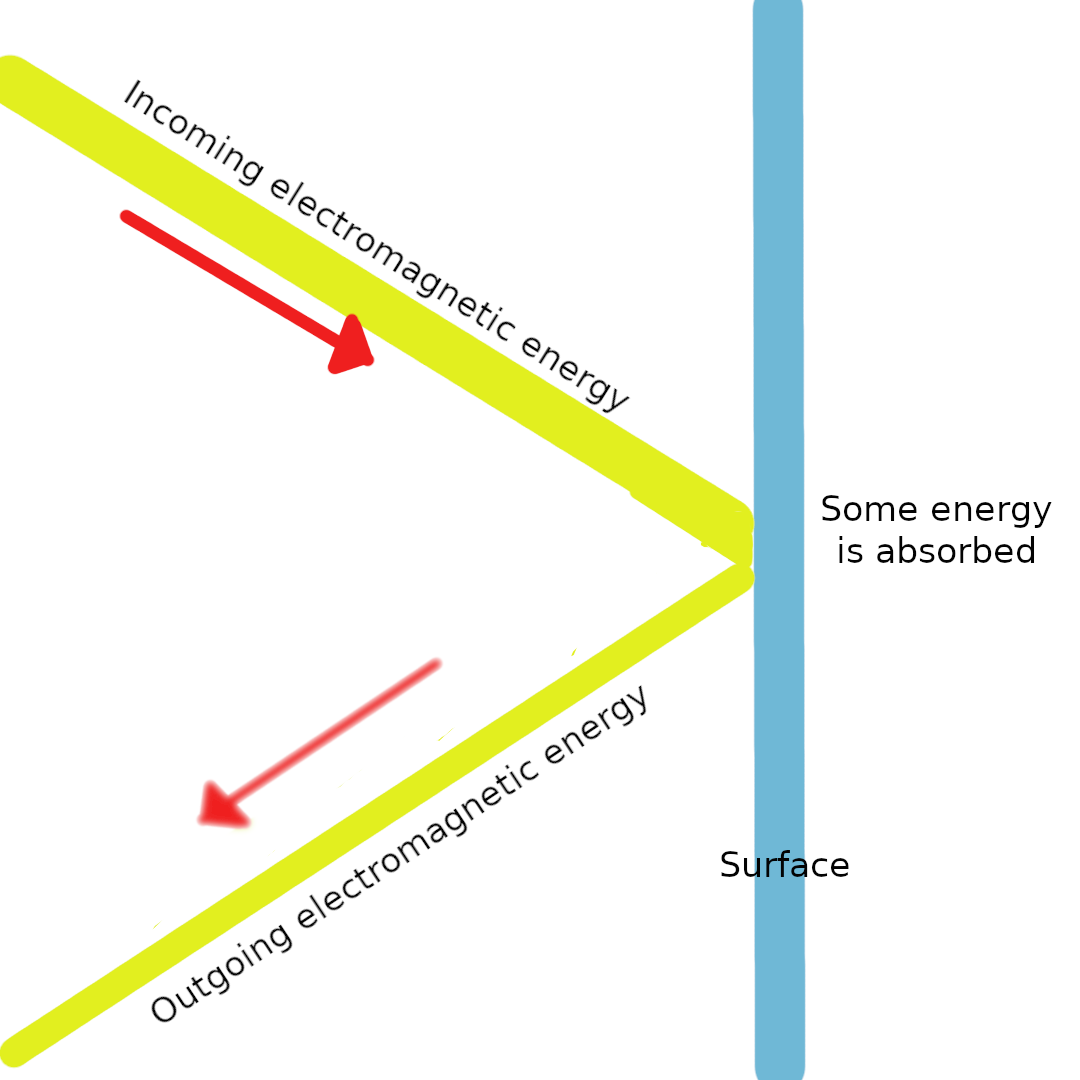
Reflection of electromagnetic energy

The light reflectance value (LRV) is a value for the reflectance of light on a scale from 0 to 1, with zero indicating no reflected light and one indicating complete reflection of light. Reflectance is the proportion of the total electromagnetic energy (EM) that is reflected, making it not a measure of the absolute amount energy in the reflection, but a ratio of the reflected energy to the total energy.

Light reflectance values are used in a variety of applications, from architecture to ecology to cartography, and can indicate how visible an interior is for those with visual impairments to being able to estimate the biomass of a forest from space.

== Architecture ==
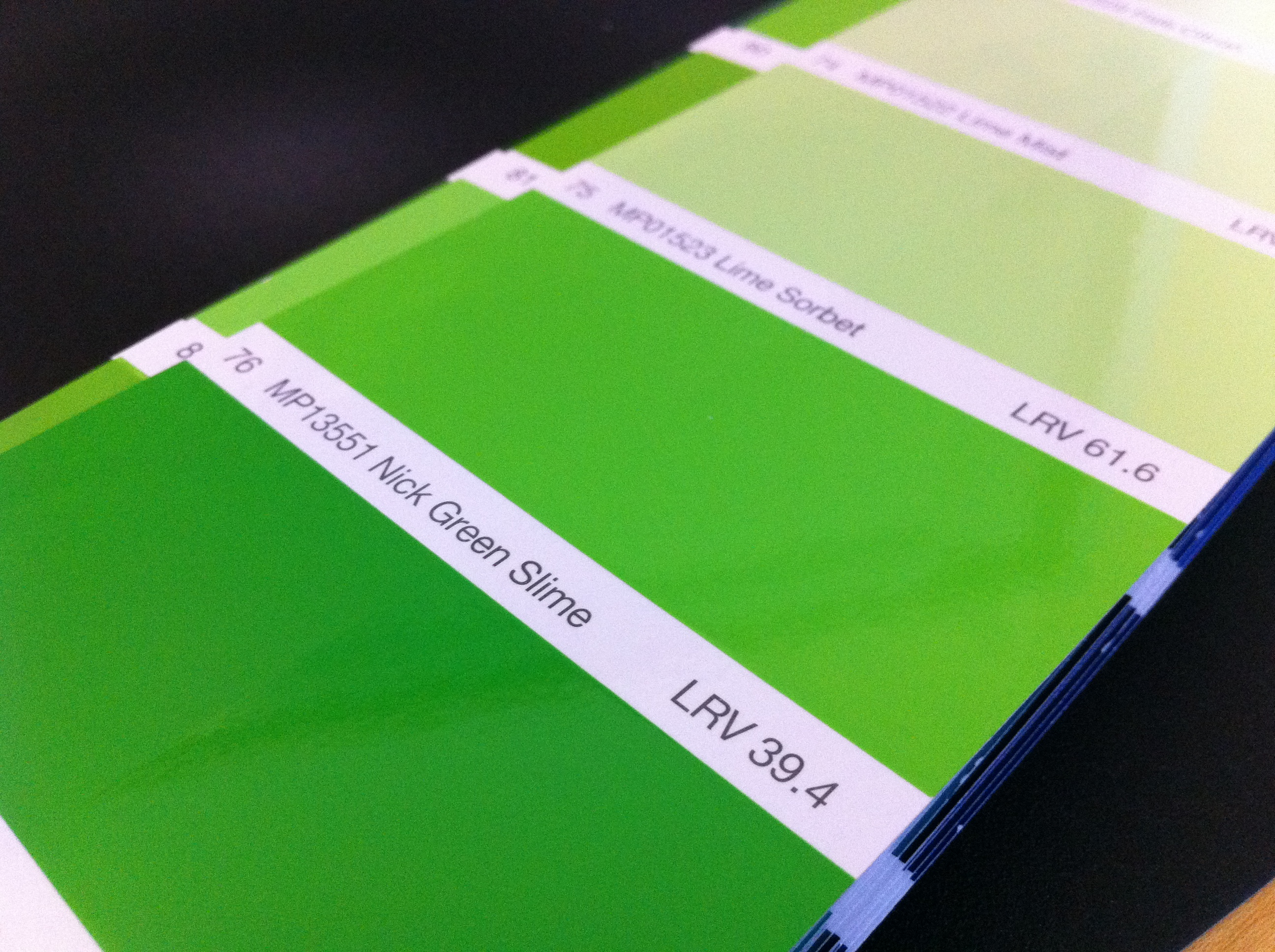
LRV on Paint Swatch

In architecture, LRV is a measure of visible and usable light that is reflected from a surface when illuminated by a light source. The measurement is most commonly used by design professionals, such as architectural color consultants, architects, environmental graphic designers and interior designers. LRVs are frequently reported on paint chips or paint samples. A spectrophotometer can be used to determine the LRV of a surface.

=== Guidance ===
Designers of buildings must comply with the building codes applicable to the structure under consideration. Since 2004 guidance has existed in England on access to and use of buildings. These regulations exist under the broader legal requirement of the Equalities Act (2010) which the guidance is particularly concerned with provisions to assist the disabled, including those who are visually impaired. The guidance highlights the need for certain surfaces and features to contrast visually with their surroundings. Areas of particular interest are wall-to-ceiling and wall-to-floor junctions, exposed edges of sloping floors, seating and its surroundings, leading edges of doors, door opening furniture and door surfaces, sanitary fittings and grab bars. Within England, this is a requirement for all non-domestic buildings, such as hospitals, schools, hotels, and theatres.

LRVs are used in building interiors, also, in order to optimize lighting efficiency and reduce energy demands. In addition, it is possible to mitigate increasing temperatures by optimizing outdoor LRVs on buildings, which may be able to decrease indoor temperatures by as much as 3°C.

=== Codes of practice ===
==== Built Environment ====
The British Standards Institute's guidance in the Regulations and in the relevant Codes of Practice, BS 8300:2018, is that adequate visual contrast is provided if the light reflectance values of the contrasting areas differ by at least thirty points. The current British Standard for the measurement of LRV is BS8493:2008+A1:2010.

The United Nations Economic Commission for Europe uses a difference of sixty points between the LRVs for the contrast requirement of signage in "Railway Applications — Design for PRM Use - General Requirements — Part 1: Contrast."

Manufacturers are advised by the Guild of Architectural Ironmongery to publish the LRV for their products.

==== Web Design ====
The Americans with Disabilities Act Standards for Accessible Design does not recommend a light reflectance value for contrast on signage with words or pictograms, but instead it provides that "characters shall contrast with their background with either light characters on a dark background or dark characters on a light background" in § 703.5.1

The International Code Council utilizes the ADA approach and does not use a light reflectance value in the 2017 update to the standards for ICC A117.1 in § 703.5.3.2

== Remote sensing ==
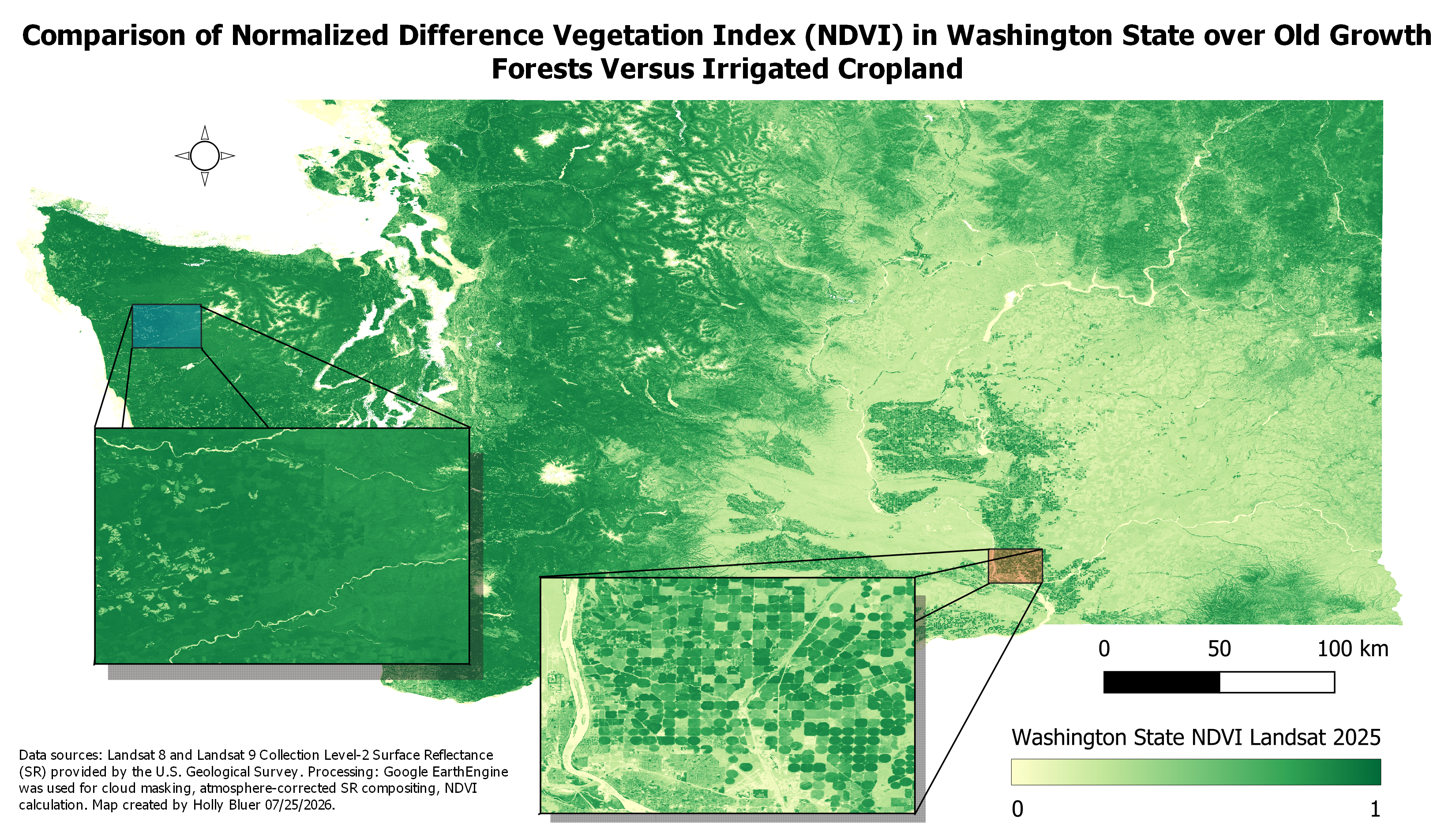
An example of a final output product that uses Light Reflectance Values to calculate the Normalized Difference Vegetation Index (NDVI) over Washington state.

LRVs are a core concept in remote sensing, as much of the imagery collected by satellites is made by sensors that count photons in a given area. The core terms for light reflectance have been laid out by Nicodermus, et al, in 1977, yet was long misinterpreted by the remote sensing community. The groundwork described a system that operates in a vacuum with light coming from a single, focused source. In real world applications, aerosols, reflection of light from other angles of incidence, diffusion of light through the atmosphere, and clouds must be corrected for. Schaepman-Strub, et al, address this in their synthesis of Nicodermus's foundation and the subsequent issues faced in remote sensing. This led to the implimentation of highly detailed calculations to increase the accuracy of the LRV data.

For the purpose of converting satellite imagery to usable reflectance data, several things have to be taken into account. In order to calculate the reflectance ratio, the irradiance (or amount of light arriving at the Earth), direct irradiance (amount of light coming specifically from the sun), and diffuse irradiance (light that has been scattered by the atmosphere before reaching the surface) needs to be known. Satellite data must be corrected for both light scattered before arriving at the surface and light scattering after reflection, as well as for atmospheric interference and scattering.

Light reflectance values in satellite imagery can cross the electromagnetic spectrum dependant on the sensors aboard the satellite. Many products created by with satellite imagery use the red, green, and blue visible spectra as well as near-infrared (NIR) and short-wave-infrared (SWIR) light. These become bands in raster images that can then be used to calculate such things as canopy cover (using the Normalized Difference Vegetation Index, NDVI) or chlorophyll productivity (using the Vertically Generalized Production Model, VGPI. Remote sensing using light reflectance values can also be used in archeology, mining, farming, oceanography, urban planning, and other industries.
