= Mathematical descriptions of opacity =

When an electromagnetic wave travels through a medium in which it gets attenuated (this is called an "opaque" or "attenuating" medium), it undergoes exponential decay as described by the Beer–Lambert law. However, there are many possible ways to characterize the wave and how quickly it is attenuated. This article describes the mathematical relationships among:

- attenuation coefficient;
- penetration depth and skin depth;
- complex angular wavenumber and propagation constant;
- complex refractive index;
- complex electric permittivity;
- AC conductivity (susceptance).

Note that in many of these cases there are multiple, conflicting definitions and conventions in common use. This article is not necessarily comprehensive or universal.

== Background: unattenuated wave ==
=== Description ===
An electromagnetic wave propagating in the +z-direction is conventionally described by the equation:
$$\mathbf{E}(z, t) = \operatorname{Re} \left[\mathbf{E}_0 e^{i(kz - \omega t)}\right]\! ,$$
where

- E_{0} is a vector in the x-y plane, with the units of an electric field (the vector is in general a complex vector, to allow for all possible polarizations and phases);
- ω is the angular frequency of the wave;
- k is the angular wavenumber of the wave;
- Re indicates real part;
- e is Euler's number.

The wavelength is, by definition,
$$\lambda = \frac{2\pi}{k}.$$
For a given frequency, the wavelength of an electromagnetic wave is affected by the material in which it is propagating. The vacuum wavelength (the wavelength that a wave of this frequency would have if it were propagating in vacuum) is
$$\lambda_0 = \frac{2\pi \mathrm{c}}{\omega},$$
where c is the speed of light in vacuum.

In the absence of attenuation, the index of refraction (also called refractive index) is the ratio of these two wavelengths, i.e.,
$$n = \frac{\lambda_0}{\lambda} = \frac{\mathrm{c}k}{\omega}.$$
The intensity of the wave is proportional to the square of the amplitude, time-averaged over many oscillations of the wave, which amounts to:
$$I(z) \propto \left|\mathbf{E}_0 e^{i(kz - \omega t)}\right|^2 = |\mathbf{E}_0|^2.$$

Note that this intensity is independent of the location z, a sign that this wave is not attenuating with distance. We define I_{0} to equal this constant intensity:
$$I(z) = I_0 \propto |\mathbf{E}_0|^2.$$

=== Complex conjugate ambiguity ===
Because
$$\operatorname{Re}\left[\mathbf{E}_0 e^{i(kz - \omega t)}\right] = \operatorname{Re}\left[\mathbf{E}_0^* e^{-i(kz - \omega t)}\right]\! ,$$
either expression can be used interchangeably. Generally, physicists and chemists use the convention on the left (with e^{−iωt}), while electrical engineers use the convention on the right (with e^{+iωt}, for example see electrical impedance). The distinction is irrelevant for an unattenuated wave, but becomes relevant in some cases below. For example, there are two definitions of complex refractive index, one with a positive imaginary part and one with a negative imaginary part, derived from the two different conventions. The two definitions are complex conjugates of each other.

== Attenuation coefficient ==
One way to incorporate attenuation into the mathematical description of the wave is via an attenuation coefficient:
$$\mathbf{E}(z, t) = e^{-\alpha z/2} \operatorname{Re}\! \left[\mathbf{E}_0 e^{i(kz - \omega t)}\right]\! ,$$
where α is the attenuation coefficient.

Then the intensity of the wave satisfies:
$$I(z) \propto \left|e^{-\alpha z/2}\mathbf{E}_0 e^{i(kz - \omega t)}\right|^2 = |\mathbf{E}_0|^2 e^{-\alpha z},$$
i.e.
$$I(z) = I_0 e^{-\alpha z}.$$

The attenuation coefficient, in turn, is simply related to several other quantities:

- absorption coefficient is essentially (but not quite always) synonymous with attenuation coefficient; see attenuation coefficient for details;
- molar absorption coefficient or molar extinction coefficient, also called molar absorptivity, is the attenuation coefficient divided by molarity (and usually multiplied by ln(10), i.e., decadic); see Beer-Lambert law and molar absorptivity for details;
- mass attenuation coefficient, also called mass extinction coefficient, is the attenuation coefficient divided by density; see mass attenuation coefficient for details;
- absorption cross section and scattering cross section are both quantitatively related to the attenuation coefficient; see absorption cross section and scattering cross section for details;
- The attenuation coefficient is also sometimes called opacity; see opacity (optics).

== Penetration depth and skin depth ==
=== Penetration depth ===
A very similar approach uses the penetration depth:
$$\begin{align}
\mathbf{E}(z, t) &= e^{-z/(2\delta_\mathrm{pen})} \operatorname{Re}\! \left[\mathbf{E}_0 e^{i(kz - \omega t)}\right]\! , \\
I(z) &= I_0 e^{-z/\delta_\mathrm{pen}},
\end{align}$$
where δ_{pen} is the penetration depth.

=== Skin depth ===
The skin depth is defined so that the wave satisfies:
$$\begin{align}
\mathbf{E}(z, t) &= e^{-z/\delta_\mathrm{skin}} \operatorname{Re}\! \left[\mathbf{E}_0 e^{i(kz - \omega t)}\right]\! , \\
I(z) &= I_0 e^{-2z/\delta_\mathrm{skin}},
\end{align}$$
where δ_{skin} is the skin depth.

Physically, the penetration depth is the distance which the wave can travel before its intensity reduces by a factor of 1/e ≈ 0.37. The skin depth is the distance which the wave can travel before its amplitude reduces by that same factor.

The absorption coefficient is related to the penetration depth and skin depth by
$$\alpha = 1/\delta_\mathrm{pen} = 2/\delta_\mathrm{skin}.$$

== Complex angular wavenumber and propagation constant ==
=== Complex angular wavenumber ===
Another way to incorporate attenuation is to use the complex angular wavenumber:
$$\mathbf{E}(z, t) = \operatorname{Re}\! \left[\mathbf{E}_0 e^{i(\underline{k}z - \omega t)}\right]\! ,$$
where k is the complex angular wavenumber.

Then the intensity of the wave satisfies:
$$I(z) \propto \left|\mathbf{E}_0 e^{i(\underline{k}z - \omega t)}\right|^2 = |\mathbf{E}_0|^2 e^{-2 \operatorname{Im}(\underline{k})z},$$
i.e.
$$I(z) = I_0 e^{-2 \operatorname{Im}(\underline{k})z}.$$

Therefore, comparing this to the absorption coefficient approach,
$$\begin{align}
\operatorname{Re}(\underline{k}) &= k, &
\operatorname{Im}(\underline{k}) &= \alpha/2.
\end{align}$$

In accordance with the ambiguity noted above, some authors use the complex conjugate definition:
$$\begin{align}
\operatorname{Re}(\underline{k}) &= k, &
\operatorname{Im}(\underline{k}) &= -\alpha/2.
\end{align}$$

=== Propagation constant ===
A closely related approach, especially common in the theory of transmission lines, uses the propagation constant:
$$\mathbf{E}(z, t) = \operatorname{Re}\! \left[\mathbf{E}_0 e^{-\gamma z + i\omega t}\right]\! ,$$
where γ is the propagation constant.

Then the intensity of the wave satisfies:
$$I(z) \propto \left|\mathbf{E}_0 e^{-\gamma z + i\omega t}\right|^2 = |\mathbf{E}_0|^2 e^{-2 \operatorname{Re}(\gamma)z},$$
i.e.
$$I(z) = I_0 e^{-2 \operatorname{Re}(\gamma)z}.$$

Comparing the two equations, the propagation constant and the complex angular wavenumber are related by:
$$\gamma = i\underline{k}^*,$$
where the * denotes complex conjugation.
$$\operatorname{Re}(\gamma) = \operatorname{Im}(\underline{k}) = \alpha/2.$$
This quantity is also called the attenuation constant, sometimes denoted α.
$$\operatorname{Im}(\gamma) = \operatorname{Re}(\underline{k}) = k.$$
This quantity is also called the phase constant, sometimes denoted β.

Unfortunately, the notation is not always consistent. For example, $\underline{k}$ is sometimes called "propagation constant" instead of γ, which swaps the real and imaginary parts.

== Complex refractive index ==
Recall that in nonattenuating media, the refractive index and angular wavenumber are related by:
$$n = \frac{\mathrm{c}}{v} = \frac{\mathrm{c}k}{\omega},$$
where

- n is the refractive index of the medium;
- c is the speed of light in vacuum;
- v is the speed of light in the medium.

A complex refractive index can therefore be defined in terms of the complex angular wavenumber defined above:
$$\underline{n} = \frac{\mathrm{c}\underline{k}}{\omega}.$$
where n is the refractive index of the medium.

In other words, the wave is required to satisfy
$$\mathbf{E}(z, t) = \operatorname{Re}\! \left[\mathbf{E}_0 e^{i\omega(\underline{n}z/\mathrm{c} - t)}\right]\! .$$

Then the intensity of the wave satisfies:
$$I(z) \propto \left|\mathbf{E}_0 e^{i\omega(\underline{n}z/\mathrm{c} - t)}\right|^2 = |\mathbf{E}_0|^2 e^{-2\omega \operatorname{Im}(\underline n)z/\mathrm{c}},$$
i.e.
$$I(z) = I_0 e^{-2\omega \operatorname{Im}(\underline n)z/\mathrm{c}}.$$

Comparing to the preceding section, we have
$$\operatorname{Re}(\underline{n}) = \frac{\mathrm{c}k}{\omega}.$$
This quantity is often (ambiguously) called simply the refractive index.
$$\operatorname{Im}(\underline{n}) = \frac{\mathrm{c}\alpha}{2\omega}=\frac{\lambda_0 \alpha}{4\pi}.$$
This quantity is called the extinction coefficient and denoted κ.

In accordance with the ambiguity noted above, some authors use the complex conjugate definition, where the (still positive) extinction coefficient is minus the imaginary part of $\underline{n}$.

== Complex electric permittivity ==
In nonattenuating media, the electric permittivity and refractive index are related by:
$$n = \mathrm{c}\sqrt{\mu \varepsilon}\quad \text{(SI)},\qquad n = \sqrt{\mu \varepsilon}\quad \text{(cgs)},$$
where

- μ is the magnetic permeability of the medium;
- ε is the electric permittivity of the medium.
- "SI" refers to the SI system of units, while "cgs" refers to Gaussian-cgs units.

In attenuating media, the same relation is used, but the permittivity is allowed to be a complex number, called complex electric permittivity:
$$\underline{n} = \mathrm{c}\sqrt{\mu \underline{\varepsilon}}\quad \text{(SI)},\qquad \underline{n} = \sqrt{\mu \underline{\varepsilon}}\quad \text{(cgs)},$$
where ε is the complex electric permittivity of the medium.

Squaring both sides and using the results of the previous section gives:
$$\begin{align}
\operatorname{Re}(\underline{\varepsilon}) &= \frac{\mathrm{c}^2 \varepsilon_0}{\omega^2 \mu/\mu_0}\! \left(k^2 - \frac{\alpha^2}{4}\right)\quad \text{(SI)}, \quad &
\operatorname{Re}(\underline{\varepsilon}) &= \frac{\mathrm{c}^2}{\omega^2 \mu}\! \left(k^2 - \frac{\alpha^2}{4}\right)\quad \text{(cgs)}, \\
\operatorname{Im}(\underline{\varepsilon}) &= \frac{\mathrm{c}^2 \varepsilon_0}{\omega^2 \mu/\mu_0}k\alpha\quad \text{(SI)}, &
\operatorname{Im}(\underline{\varepsilon}) &= \frac{\mathrm{c}^2}{\omega^2 \mu}k\alpha\quad \text{(cgs)}.
\end{align}$$

== AC conductivity ==
Another way to incorporate attenuation is through the electric conductivity, as follows.

One of the equations governing electromagnetic wave propagation is the Maxwell-Ampere law:
$$\nabla \times \mathbf{H} = \mathbf{J_f} + \frac{\mathrm{d}\mathbf{D}}{\mathrm{d}t}\quad \text{(SI)},\qquad \nabla \times \mathbf{H} = \frac{4\pi}{\mathrm{c}} \mathbf{J_f} + \frac{1}{\mathrm{c}}\frac{\mathrm{d}\mathbf{D}}{\mathrm{d}t}\quad \text{(cgs)},$$
where $\mathbf{D}$ is the displacement field.

Plugging in Ohm's law and the definition of (real) permittivity
$$\nabla \times \mathbf{H} = \sigma \mathbf{E} + \varepsilon \frac{\mathrm{d}\mathbf{E}}{\mathrm{d}t}\quad \text{(SI)},\qquad \nabla \times \mathbf{H} = \frac{4\pi \sigma}{\mathrm{c}} \mathbf{E} + \frac{\varepsilon}{\mathrm{c}}\frac{\mathrm{d}\mathbf{E}}{\mathrm{d}t}\quad \text{(cgs)},$$
where σ is the (real, but frequency-dependent) electrical conductivity, called AC conductivity.

With sinusoidal time dependence on all quantities, i.e.
$$\begin{align}
\mathbf{H} &= \operatorname{Re}\! \left[\mathbf{H}_0 e^{-i\omega t}\right]\! ,\\
\mathbf{E} &= \operatorname{Re}\! \left[\mathbf{E}_0 e^{-i\omega t}\right]\! ,
\end{align}$$
the result is
$$\nabla \times \mathbf{H}_0 = -i\omega\mathbf{E}_0 \! \left(\varepsilon + i\frac{\sigma}{\omega}\right)\quad \text{(SI)},\qquad \nabla \times \mathbf{H}_0 = \frac{-i\omega}{\mathrm{c}} \mathbf{E}_0 \! \left(\varepsilon + i\frac{4\pi \sigma}{\omega}\right)\quad \text{(cgs)}.$$

If the current $\mathbf{J_f}$ were not included explicitly (through Ohm's law), but only implicitly (through a complex permittivity), the quantity in parentheses would be simply the complex electric permittivity. Therefore,
$$\underline{\varepsilon} = \varepsilon + i\frac{\sigma}{\omega}\quad \text{(SI)},\qquad \underline{\varepsilon} = \varepsilon + i\frac{4\pi \sigma}{\omega}\quad \text{(cgs)}.$$
Comparing to the previous section, the AC conductivity satisfies
$$\sigma = \frac{k\alpha}{\omega \mu}\quad \text{(SI)},\qquad \sigma = \frac{k\alpha \mathrm{c}^2}{4\pi \omega \mu}\quad \text{(cgs)}.$$
