= Transmittance =

Effectiveness of a material in transmitting radiant energy

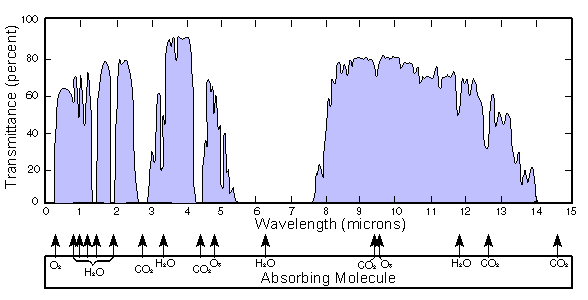
Earth's atmospheric transmittance over 1 nautical mile sea level path (infrared region). Because of the natural radiation of the hot atmosphere, the intensity of radiation is different from the transmitted part.

Transmittance of ruby in optical and near-IR spectra. Note the two broad blue and green absorption bands and one narrow absorption band on the wavelength of 694 nm, which is the wavelength of the ruby laser.

Electromagnetic radiation can be affected in several ways by the medium in which it propagates. It can be scattered, absorbed, and reflected and refracted at discontinuities in the medium. This page is an overview of the last 3. The transmittance of a material and any surfaces is its effectiveness in transmitting radiant energy; the fraction of the initial (incident) radiation which propagates to a location of interest (often an observation location). This may be described by the transmission coefficient.

== Surface transmittance ==
=== Hemispherical transmittance ===
Hemispherical transmittance of a surface, denoted T, is defined as

$$T = \frac{\Phi_\mathrm{e}^\mathrm{t}}{\Phi_\mathrm{e}^\mathrm{i}},$$

where

- Φ_{e}^{t} is the radiant flux transmitted by that surface into the hemisphere on the opposite side from the incident radiation;
- Φ_{e}^{i} is the radiant flux received by that surface.

Hemispheric transmittance may be calculated as an integral over the directional transmittance described below.

=== Spectral hemispherical transmittance ===
Spectral hemispherical transmittance in frequency and spectral hemispherical transmittance in wavelength of a surface, denoted T_{ν} and T_{λ} respectively, are defined as

$$T_\nu = \frac{\Phi_{\mathrm{e},\nu}^\mathrm{t}}{\Phi_{\mathrm{e},\nu}^\mathrm{i}},$$
$$T_\lambda = \frac{\Phi_{\mathrm{e},\lambda}^\mathrm{t}}{\Phi_{\mathrm{e},\lambda}^\mathrm{i}},$$

where

- Φ_{e,ν}^{t} is the spectral radiant flux in frequency transmitted by that surface into the hemisphere on the opposite side from the incident radiation;
- Φ_{e,ν}^{i} is the spectral radiant flux in frequency received by that surface;
- Φ_{e,λ}^{t} is the spectral radiant flux in wavelength transmitted by that surface into the hemisphere on the opposite side from the incident radiation;
- Φ_{e,λ}^{i} is the spectral radiant flux in wavelength received by that surface.

=== Directional transmittance ===
Directional transmittance of a surface, denoted T_{Ω}, is defined as

$$T_\Omega = \frac{L_{\mathrm{e},\Omega}^\mathrm{t}}{L_{\mathrm{e},\Omega}^\mathrm{i}},$$

where

- L_{e,Ω}^{t} is the radiance transmitted by that surface into the solid angle Ω;
- L_{e,Ω}^{i} is the radiance received by that surface.

=== Spectral directional transmittance ===
Spectral directional transmittance in frequency and spectral directional transmittance in wavelength of a surface, denoted T_{ν,Ω} and T_{λ,Ω} respectively, are defined as

$$T_{\nu,\Omega} = \frac{L_{\mathrm{e},\Omega,\nu}^\mathrm{t}}{L_{\mathrm{e},\Omega,\nu}^\mathrm{i}},$$
$$T_{\lambda,\Omega} = \frac{L_{\mathrm{e},\Omega,\lambda}^\mathrm{t}}{L_{\mathrm{e},\Omega,\lambda}^\mathrm{i}},$$

where

- L_{e,Ω,ν}^{t} is the spectral radiance in frequency transmitted by that surface;
- L_{e,Ω,ν}^{i} is the spectral radiance received by that surface;
- L_{e,Ω,λ}^{t} is the spectral radiance in wavelength transmitted by that surface;
- L_{e,Ω,λ}^{i} is the spectral radiance in wavelength received by that surface.

=== Luminous transmittance ===
In the field of photometry (optics), the luminous transmittance of a filter is a measure of the amount of luminous flux or intensity transmitted by an optical filter. It is generally defined in terms of a standard illuminant (e.g. Illuminant A, Iluminant C, or Illuminant E). The luminous transmittance with respect to the standard illuminant is defined as:

$$T_{lum} = \frac{\int_0^\infty I(\lambda)T(\lambda)V(\lambda)d\lambda}{\int_0^\infty I(\lambda)V(\lambda)d\lambda}$$

where:

- $I(\lambda)$ is the spectral radiant flux or intensity of the standard illuminant (unspecified magnitude).
- $T(\lambda)$ is the spectral transmittance of the filter
- $V(\lambda)$ is the luminous efficiency function

The luminous transmittance is independent of the magnitude of the flux or intensity of the standard illuminant used to measure it, and is a dimensionless quantity.

== Internal transmittance ==
=== Optical depth ===
By definition, internal transmittance is related to optical depth and to absorbance as

$$T = e^{-\tau} = 10^{-A},$$

where

- τ is the optical depth;
- A is the absorbance.

=== Beer–Lambert law ===
The Beer–Lambert law states that, for N attenuating species in the material sample,

$$\tau = \sum_{i = 1}^N \tau_i = \sum_{i = 1}^N \sigma_i \int_0^\ell n_i(z)\,\mathrm{d}z,$$
$$A = \sum_{i = 1}^N A_i = \sum_{i = 1}^N \varepsilon_i \int_0^\ell c_i(z)\,\mathrm{d}z,$$

where

- σ_{i} is the attenuation cross section of the attenuating species i in the material sample;
- n_{i} is the number density of the attenuating species i in the material sample;
- ε_{i} is the molar attenuation coefficient of the attenuating species i in the material sample;
- c_{i} is the amount concentration of the attenuating species i in the material sample;
- ℓ is the path length of the beam of light through the material sample.

Attenuation cross section and molar attenuation coefficient are related by

$$\varepsilon_i = \frac{\mathrm{N_A}}{\ln{10}}\,\sigma_i,$$

and number density and amount concentration by

$$c_i = \frac{n_i}{\mathrm{N_A}},$$

where N_{A} is the Avogadro constant.

In case of uniform attenuation, these relations become

$$\tau = \sum_{i = 1}^N \sigma_i n_i\ell,$$
$$A = \sum_{i = 1}^N \varepsilon_i c_i\ell.$$

Cases of non-uniform attenuation occur in atmospheric science applications and radiation shielding theory for instance.

== Other radiometric coefficients ==
Radiometry coefficients
Quantity		SI units	Notes
Name	Sym.	SI units	Notes
Hemispherical emissivity	ε	—	Radiant exitance of a surface, divided by that of a black body at the same temperature as that surface.
Spectral hemispherical emissivity	ε_{ν} ε_{λ}	—	Spectral exitance of a surface, divided by that of a black body at the same temperature as that surface.
Directional emissivity	ε_{Ω}	—	Radiance emitted by a surface, divided by that emitted by a black body at the same temperature as that surface.
Spectral directional emissivity	ε_{Ω,ν} ε_{Ω,λ}	—	Spectral radiance emitted by a surface, divided by that of a black body at the same temperature as that surface.
Hemispherical absorptance	A	—	Radiant flux absorbed by a surface, divided by that received by that surface. This should not be confused with "absorbance".
Spectral hemispherical absorptance	A_{ν} A_{λ}	—	Spectral flux absorbed by a surface, divided by that received by that surface. This should not be confused with "spectral absorbance".
Directional absorptance	A_{Ω}	—	Radiance absorbed by a surface, divided by the radiance incident onto that surface. This should not be confused with "absorbance".
Spectral directional absorptance	A_{Ω,ν} A_{Ω,λ}	—	Spectral radiance absorbed by a surface, divided by the spectral radiance incident onto that surface. This should not be confused with "spectral absorbance".
Hemispherical reflectance	R	—	Radiant flux reflected by a surface, divided by that received by that surface.
Spectral hemispherical reflectance	R_{ν} R_{λ}	—	Spectral flux reflected by a surface, divided by that received by that surface.
Directional reflectance	R_{Ω}	—	Radiance reflected by a surface, divided by that received by that surface.
Spectral directional reflectance	R_{Ω,ν} R_{Ω,λ}	—	Spectral radiance reflected by a surface, divided by that received by that surface.
Hemispherical transmittance	T	—	Radiant flux transmitted by a surface, divided by that received by that surface.
Spectral hemispherical transmittance	T_{ν} T_{λ}	—	Spectral flux transmitted by a surface, divided by that received by that surface.
Directional transmittance	T_{Ω}	—	Radiance transmitted by a surface, divided by that received by that surface.
Spectral directional transmittance	T_{Ω,ν} T_{Ω,λ}	—	Spectral radiance transmitted by a surface, divided by that received by that surface.
Hemispherical attenuation coefficient	μ	m^{−1}	Radiant flux absorbed and scattered by a volume per unit length, divided by that received by that volume.
Spectral hemispherical attenuation coefficient	μ_{ν} μ_{λ}	m^{−1}	Spectral radiant flux absorbed and scattered by a volume per unit length, divided by that received by that volume.
Directional attenuation coefficient	μ_{Ω}	m^{−1}	Radiance absorbed and scattered by a volume per unit length, divided by that received by that volume.
Spectral directional attenuation coefficient	μ_{Ω,ν} μ_{Ω,λ}	m^{−1}	Spectral radiance absorbed and scattered by a volume per unit length, divided by that received by that volume.

== See also ==
- Opacity (optics)
- Photometry (optics)
- Radiometry
