= Absorptance =

Ability of a material to absorb radiant energy

In the study of heat transfer, absorptance of the surface of a material is its effectiveness in absorbing radiant energy. It is the ratio of the absorbed to the incident radiant power.

== Mathematical definitions ==
=== Hemispherical absorptance ===
Hemispherical absorptance of a surface, denoted A is defined as

$$A = \mathrm{ \frac{\Phi_e^a}{\Phi_e^i} },$$

where

- $\mathrm{\Phi_e^a}$ is the radiant flux absorbed by that surface;
- $\mathrm{\Phi_e^i}$ is the radiant flux received by that surface.

=== Spectral hemispherical absorptance ===
Spectral hemispherical absorptance in frequency and spectral hemispherical absorptance in wavelength of a surface, denoted A_{ν} and A_{λ} respectively, are defined as

$$\begin{align}
A_\nu &= \mathrm{ \frac{\Phi_{e,\nu}^a}{\Phi_{e,\nu}^i} }, \\
A_\lambda &= \mathrm{ \frac{\Phi_{e,\lambda}^a}{\Phi_{e,\lambda}^i} },
\end{align}$$

where

- $\mathrm{\Phi_{e,\nu}^a}$ is the spectral radiant flux in frequency absorbed by that surface;
- $\mathrm{\Phi_{e,\nu}^i}$ is the spectral radiant flux in frequency received by that surface;
- $\mathrm{\Phi_{e,\lambda}^a}$ is the spectral radiant flux in wavelength absorbed by that surface;
- $\mathrm{\Phi_{e,\lambda}^i}$ is the spectral radiant flux in wavelength received by that surface.

=== Directional absorptance ===
Directional absorptance of a surface, denoted A_{Ω}, is defined as

$$A_\Omega = \frac{L_\mathrm{\mathrm{e},\Omega}^\mathrm{a}}{L_{\mathrm{e},\Omega}^\mathrm{i}},$$

where

- $L\mathrm{_{e,\Omega}^a}$ is the radiance absorbed by that surface;
- $L\mathrm{_{e,\Omega}^i}$ is the radiance received by that surface.

=== Spectral directional absorptance ===
Spectral directional absorptance in frequency and spectral directional absorptance in wavelength of a surface, denoted A_{ν,Ω} and A_{λ,Ω} respectively, are defined as

$$\begin{align}
A_{\nu,\Omega} &= \frac{L\mathrm{_{e,\Omega,\nu}^a}}{L\mathrm{_{e,\Omega,\nu}^i}}, \\[4pt]
A_{\lambda,\Omega} &= \frac{L\mathrm{_{e,\Omega,\lambda}^a}}{L\mathrm{_{e,\Omega,\lambda}^i}},
\end{align}$$

where

- $L\mathrm{_{e,\Omega,\nu}^a}$ is the spectral radiance in frequency absorbed by that surface;
- $L\mathrm{_{e,\Omega,\nu}^i}$ is the spectral radiance received by that surface;
- $L\mathrm{_{e,\Omega,\lambda}^a}$ is the spectral radiance in wavelength absorbed by that surface;
- $L\mathrm{_{e,\Omega,\lambda}^i}$ is the spectral radiance in wavelength received by that surface.

== Other radiometric coefficients ==
Radiometry coefficients
Quantity		SI units	Notes
Name	Sym.	SI units	Notes
Hemispherical emissivity	ε	—	Radiant exitance of a surface, divided by that of a black body at the same temperature as that surface.
Spectral hemispherical emissivity	ε_{ν} ε_{λ}	—	Spectral exitance of a surface, divided by that of a black body at the same temperature as that surface.
Directional emissivity	ε_{Ω}	—	Radiance emitted by a surface, divided by that emitted by a black body at the same temperature as that surface.
Spectral directional emissivity	ε_{Ω,ν} ε_{Ω,λ}	—	Spectral radiance emitted by a surface, divided by that of a black body at the same temperature as that surface.
Hemispherical absorptance	A	—	Radiant flux absorbed by a surface, divided by that received by that surface. This should not be confused with "absorbance".
Spectral hemispherical absorptance	A_{ν} A_{λ}	—	Spectral flux absorbed by a surface, divided by that received by that surface. This should not be confused with "spectral absorbance".
Directional absorptance	A_{Ω}	—	Radiance absorbed by a surface, divided by the radiance incident onto that surface. This should not be confused with "absorbance".
Spectral directional absorptance	A_{Ω,ν} A_{Ω,λ}	—	Spectral radiance absorbed by a surface, divided by the spectral radiance incident onto that surface. This should not be confused with "spectral absorbance".
Hemispherical reflectance	R	—	Radiant flux reflected by a surface, divided by that received by that surface.
Spectral hemispherical reflectance	R_{ν} R_{λ}	—	Spectral flux reflected by a surface, divided by that received by that surface.
Directional reflectance	R_{Ω}	—	Radiance reflected by a surface, divided by that received by that surface.
Spectral directional reflectance	R_{Ω,ν} R_{Ω,λ}	—	Spectral radiance reflected by a surface, divided by that received by that surface.
Hemispherical transmittance	T	—	Radiant flux transmitted by a surface, divided by that received by that surface.
Spectral hemispherical transmittance	T_{ν} T_{λ}	—	Spectral flux transmitted by a surface, divided by that received by that surface.
Directional transmittance	T_{Ω}	—	Radiance transmitted by a surface, divided by that received by that surface.
Spectral directional transmittance	T_{Ω,ν} T_{Ω,λ}	—	Spectral radiance transmitted by a surface, divided by that received by that surface.
Hemispherical attenuation coefficient	μ	m^{−1}	Radiant flux absorbed and scattered by a volume per unit length, divided by that received by that volume.
Spectral hemispherical attenuation coefficient	μ_{ν} μ_{λ}	m^{−1}	Spectral radiant flux absorbed and scattered by a volume per unit length, divided by that received by that volume.
Directional attenuation coefficient	μ_{Ω}	m^{−1}	Radiance absorbed and scattered by a volume per unit length, divided by that received by that volume.
Spectral directional attenuation coefficient	μ_{Ω,ν} μ_{Ω,λ}	m^{−1}	Spectral radiance absorbed and scattered by a volume per unit length, divided by that received by that volume.
