= Suwa =

Suwa or SUWA may refer to:

== Places ==
- Suwa Province, an old Japanese province located in Tōsandō for a brief period of time, which today composes the southern part of Nagano Prefecture
- Suwa, Nagano, a city in Nagano Prefecture, Japan
- Suwa Shrine (disambiguation), the name of several Shinto shrines in Japan
- Lake Suwa, a lake in the Kiso Mountains, in the central region of Nagano Prefecture, Japan
- Suwa, a small ancient Egyptian site about 10 km south-east of Zagazig in the Nile Delta
- Suwa, Diz, a historical Assyrian hamlet in Hakkari, Turkey

== Organizations ==
- Southern Utah Wilderness Alliance, a wilderness preservation organization in the United States based in Salt Lake City, Utah

== People ==
- Michiko Suwa (1935–2015), the maiden name of Japanese-American marathoner Miki Gorman
- Nanaka Suwa (born 1994), Japanese voice actress
- Nejiko Suwa (1920–2012), Japanese violinist
- Nobuhiro Suwa (born 1960), Japanese film director
- Suwa Tadamasa (諏訪 忠誠; 1821–1898), Japanese daimyō
- Takahiro Suwa (born 1975), Japanese wrestler better known by his ring name "SUWA"
- Tetsushi Suwa (born 1969), Japanese writer
- Toshinari Suwa (born 1977), Japanese marathon runner
- Suwa Kanenori (1897–1932), Japanese woodblock print artist
- Suwa Yorimitsu (1480–1540), Japanese warlord of the Shinano Province
- Suwa Yorishige (1516–1542), Japanese lord of Kuwabara castle

== Fictional characters ==
- Amaki Suwa, Goshiki Suwa, and Masuzu Suwa, fictional characters from the Strike Witches franchise

== Other ==
- Suwa', an idol mentioned in the Qur'an
- Suwa, the traditional beer of the Tigray Region in Ethiopia.

== See also ==
- Suva (disambiguation)
