= Spectrophotometry =

Branch of spectroscopy

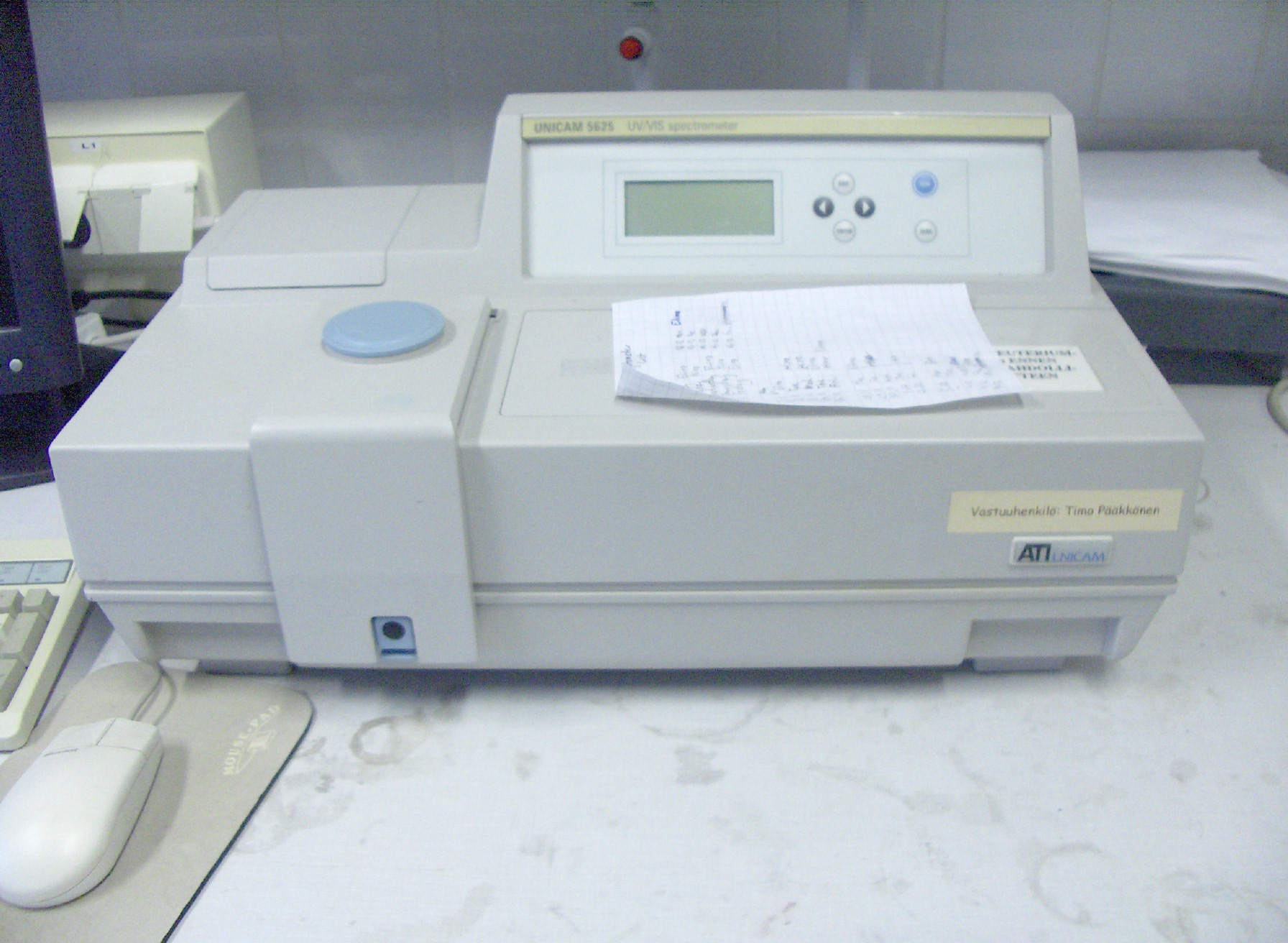
Table-top spectrophotometer

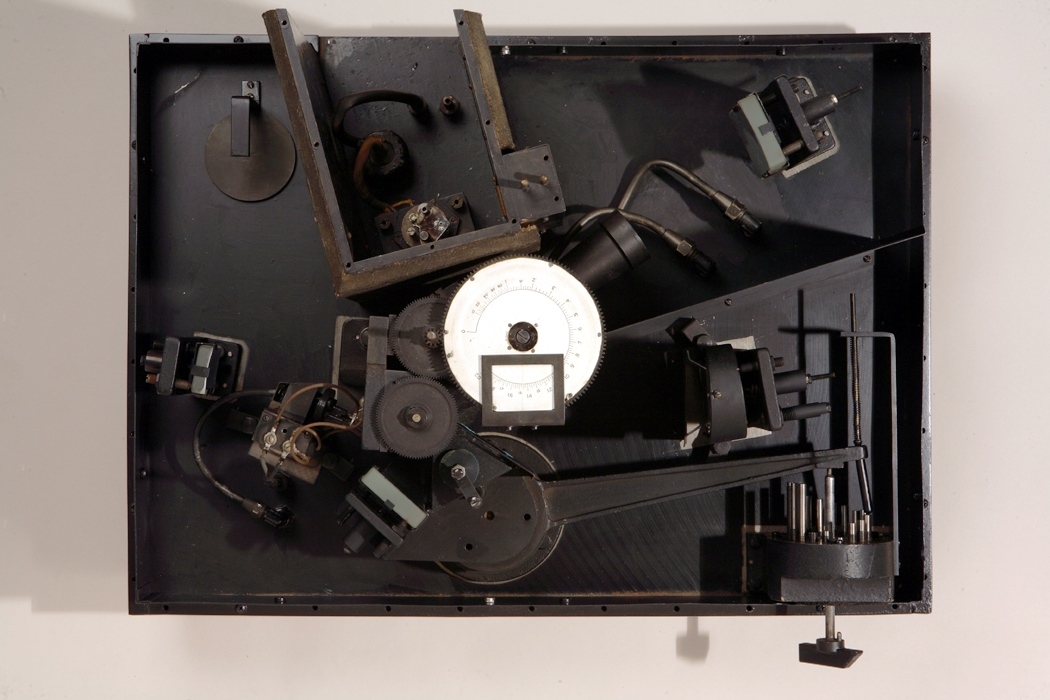
Beckman IR-1 Spectrophotometer, c. 1941

Beckman Model DB Spectrophotometer (a double beam model), 1960

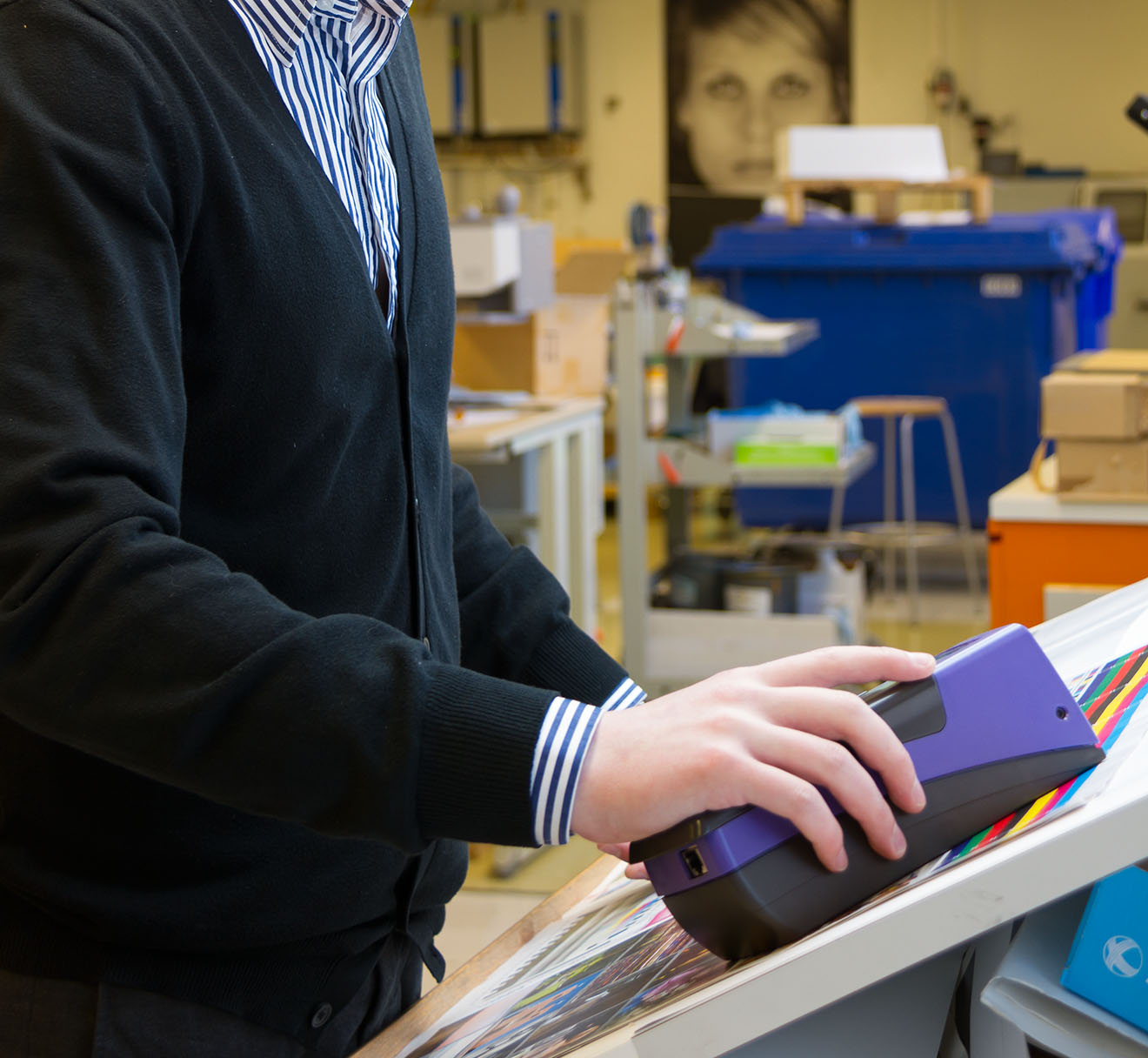
Hand-held spectrophotometer used in graphic industry

Spectrophotometry is a branch of electromagnetic spectroscopy concerned with the quantitative measurement of the reflection or transmission properties of a material as a function of wavelength. Spectrophotometry uses photometers, known as spectrophotometers, that can measure the intensity of a light beam at different wavelengths. Although spectrophotometry is most commonly applied to ultraviolet, visible, and infrared radiation, modern spectrophotometers can interrogate wide swaths of the electromagnetic spectrum, including x-ray, ultraviolet, visible, infrared, or microwave wavelengths.

== Overview ==
Spectrophotometry is a tool that hinges on the quantitative analysis of molecules depending on how much light is absorbed by colored compounds. Important features of spectrophotometers are spectral bandwidth (the range of colors it can transmit through the test sample), the percentage of sample transmission, the logarithmic range of sample absorption, and sometimes a percentage of reflectance measurement.

A spectrophotometer is commonly used for the measurement of transmittance or reflectance of solutions, transparent or opaque solids, such as polished glass, or gases. Although many biochemicals are colored, as in, they absorb visible light and therefore can be measured by colorimetric procedures, even colorless biochemicals can often be converted to colored compounds suitable for chromogenic color-forming reactions to yield compounds suitable for colorimetric analysis. However, they can also be designed to measure the diffusivity on any of the listed light ranges that usually cover around 200–2500 nm using different controls and calibrations. Within these ranges of light, calibrations are needed on the machine using standards that vary in type depending on the wavelength of the photometric determination.

An example of an experiment in which spectrophotometry is used is the determination of the equilibrium constant of a solution. A certain chemical reaction within a solution may occur in a forward and reverse direction, where reactants form products and products break down into reactants. At some point, this chemical reaction will reach a point of balance called an equilibrium point. To determine the respective concentrations of reactants and products at this point, the light transmittance of the solution can be tested using spectrophotometry. The amount of light that passes through the solution is indicative of the concentration of certain chemicals that do not allow light to pass through.

The absorption of light is due to the interaction of light with the electronic and vibrational modes of molecules. Each type of molecule has an individual set of energy levels associated with the makeup of its chemical bonds and nuclei and thus will absorb light of specific wavelengths, or energies, resulting in unique spectral properties. This is based upon its specific and distinct makeup.

The use of spectrophotometers spans various scientific fields, such as physics, materials science, chemistry, biochemistry, chemical engineering, and molecular biology. They are widely used in many industries including semiconductors, laser and optical manufacturing, printing and forensic examination, as well as in laboratories for the study of chemical substances. Spectrophotometry is often used in measurements of enzyme activities, determinations of protein concentrations, determinations of enzymatic kinetic constants, and measurements of ligand binding reactions. Ultimately, a spectrophotometer is able to determine, depending on the control or calibration, what substances are present in a target and exactly how much through calculations of observed wavelengths.

In astronomy, the term spectrophotometry refers to the measurement of the spectrum of a celestial object in which the flux scale of the spectrum is calibrated as a function of wavelength, usually by comparison with an observation of a spectrophotometric standard star, and corrected for the absorption of light by the Earth's atmosphere.

== History ==
Invented by Arnold O. Beckman in 1940, the spectrophotometer was created with the aid of his colleagues at his company National Technical Laboratories founded in 1935 which would become Beckman Instrument Company and ultimately Beckman Coulter. This would come as a solution to the previously created spectrophotometers which were unable to absorb the ultraviolet correctly. He would start with the invention of Model A where a glass prism was used to absorb the UV light. It would be found that this did not give satisfactory results, therefore in Model B, there was a shift from a glass to a quartz prism which allowed for better absorbance results. From there, Model C was born with an adjustment to the wavelength resolution which ended up having three units of it produced. The last and most popular model became Model D which is better recognized now as the DU spectrophotometer which contained the instrument case, hydrogen lamp with ultraviolet continuum, and a better monochromator. It was produced from 1941 to 1976 where the price for it in 1941 was US$723 (far-UV accessories were an option at additional cost). In the words of Nobel chemistry laureate Bruce Merrifield, it was "probably the most important instrument ever developed towards the advancement of bioscience."

Once it became discontinued in 1976, Hewlett-Packard created the first commercially available diode-array spectrophotometer in 1979 known as the HP 8450A. Diode-array spectrophotometers differed from the original spectrophotometer created by Beckman because it was the first single-beam microprocessor-controlled spectrophotometer that scanned multiple wavelengths at a time in seconds. It irradiates the sample with polychromatic light which the sample absorbs depending on its properties. Then it is transmitted back by grating the photodiode array which detects the wavelength region of the spectrum. Since then, the creation and implementation of spectrophotometry devices has increased immensely.

== Design ==
Single-beam scanning spectrophotometer

There are two major classes of devices: single-beam and double-beam. A double-beam spectrophotometer compares the light intensity between two light paths, one path containing a reference sample and the other the test sample. A single-beam spectrophotometer measures the relative light intensity of the beam before and after a test sample is inserted. Although comparison measurements from double-beam instruments are easier and more stable, single-beam instruments can have a larger dynamic range and are optically simpler and more compact. Additionally, some specialized instruments, such as spectrophotometers built onto microscopes or telescopes, are single-beam instruments due to practicality.

Historically, spectrophotometers use a monochromator containing a diffraction grating to produce the analytical spectrum. The grating can either be movable or fixed. If a single detector, such as a photomultiplier tube or photodiode is used, the grating can be scanned stepwise (scanning spectrophotometer) so that the detector can measure the light intensity at each wavelength (which will correspond to each "step"). Arrays of detectors (array spectrophotometer), such as charge-coupled devices (CCD) or photodiode arrays (PDA) can also be used. In such systems, the grating is fixed and the intensity of each wavelength of light is measured by a different detector in the array. Additionally, most modern mid-infrared spectrophotometers use a Fourier transform technique to acquire the spectral information. This technique is called Fourier transform infrared spectroscopy.

When making transmission measurements, the spectrophotometer quantitatively compares the fraction of light that passes through a reference solution and a test solution, then electronically compares the intensities of the two signals and computes the percentage of transmission of the sample compared to the reference standard. For reflectance measurements, the spectrophotometer quantitatively compares the fraction of light that reflects from the reference and test samples. Light from the source lamp is passed through a monochromator, which diffracts the light into a "rainbow" of wavelengths through a rotating prism and outputs narrow bandwidths of this diffracted spectrum through a mechanical slit on the output side of the monochromator. These bandwidths are transmitted through the test sample. Then the photon flux density (watts per meter squared usually) of the transmitted or reflected light is measured with a photodiode, CCD or other light sensor. The transmittance or reflectance value for each wavelength of the test sample is then compared with the transmission or reflectance values from the reference sample. Most instruments will apply a logarithmic function to the linear transmittance ratio to calculate the 'absorbency' of the sample, a value which is proportional to the 'concentration' of the chemical being measured.

In short, the sequence of events in a scanning spectrophotometer is as follows:

1. The light source is shone into a monochromator, diffracted into a rainbow, and split into two beams. It is then scanned through the sample and the reference solutions.
2. Fractions of the incident wavelengths are transmitted through, or reflected from, the sample and the reference.
3. The resultant light strikes the photodetector device, which compares the relative intensity of the two beams.
4. Electronic circuits convert the relative currents into linear transmission percentages or absorbance or concentration values.

In an array spectrophotometer, the sequence is as follows:

1. The light source is shone into the sample and focused into a slit
2. The transmitted light is refracted into a rainbow with the reflection grating
3. The resulting light strikes the photodetector device which compares the intensity of the beam
4. Electronic circuits convert the relative currents into linear transmission percentages and/or absorbance/concentration values

Many older spectrophotometers must be calibrated by a procedure known as "zeroing", to balance the null current output of the two beams at the detector. The transmission of a reference substance is set as a baseline (datum) value, so the transmission of all other substances is recorded relative to the initial "zeroed" substance. The spectrophotometer then converts the transmission ratio into 'absorbency', the concentration of specific components of the test sample relative to the initial substance.

=== Types of spectrophotometers ===
Some common types of spectrophotometers include the following:

- UV-Vis spectrophotometer: Measures light absorption in UV and visible ranges (200-800 nm). Used for quantification of many inorganic and organic compounds.
- Infrared spectrophotometer: Measures infrared light absorption, allowing identification of chemical bonds and functional groups.
- Atomic absorption spectrophotometer (AAS): Uses absorption of light by vaporized analyte atoms to determine concentrations of metals and metalloids.
- Fluorescence spectrophotometer: Measures intensity of fluorescent light emitted from samples after excitation. Allows highly sensitive analysis of samples with native or induced fluorescence.
- Colorimeter: Simple spectrophotometers used to measure light absorption for colorimetric assays and tests.

=== Applications in biochemistry ===
Spectrophotometry is an important technique used in many biochemical experiments that involve DNA, RNA, and protein isolation, enzyme kinetics and biochemical analyses. Since samples in these applications are not readily available in large quantities, they are especially suited to be analyzed in this non-destructive technique. In addition, precious sample can be saved by utilizing a micro-volume platform where as little as 1uL of sample is required for complete analyses. A brief explanation of the procedure of spectrophotometry includes comparing the absorbency of a blank sample that does not contain a colored compound to a sample that contains a colored compound. This coloring can be accomplished by either a dye such as Coomassie Brilliant Blue G-250 dye measured at 595 nm or by an enzymatic reaction as seen between β-galactosidase and ONPG (turns sample yellow) measured at 420 nm. The spectrophotometer is used to measure colored compounds in the visible region of light (between 350 nm and 800 nm), thus it can be used to find more information about the substance being studied. In biochemical experiments, a chemical and/or physical property is chosen and the procedure that is used is specific to that property to derive more information about the sample, such as the quantity, purity, enzyme activity, etc. Spectrophotometry can be used for a number of techniques such as determining optimal wavelength absorbance of samples, determining optimal pH for absorbance of samples, determining concentrations of unknown samples, and determining the pKa of various samples. Spectrophotometry is also a helpful process for protein purification and can also be used as a method to create optical assays of a compound. Spectrophotometric data can also be used in conjunction with the Beer–Lambert Equation, $A=-\log_{10}T=\epsilon cl=OD$, to determine various relationships between transmittance and concentration, and absorbance and concentration. Because a spectrophotometer measures the wavelength of a compound through its color, a dye-binding substance can be added so that it can undergo a color change and be measured. It is possible to know the concentrations of a two-component mixture using the absorption spectra of the standard solutions of each component. To do this, it is necessary to know the extinction coefficient of this mixture at two wavelengths and the extinction coefficients of solutions that contain the known weights of the two components. In addition to the traditional Beer-Lamberts law model, cuvette based label free spectroscopy can be used, which add an optical filter in the pathways of the light, enabling the spectrophotometer to quantify concentration, size and refractive index of samples following the hands law. Spectrophotometers have been developed and improved over decades and have been widely used among chemists. Additionally, spectrophotometers are specialized to measure either UV or Visible light wavelength absorbance values. It is considered to be a highly accurate instrument that is also very sensitive and therefore extremely precise, especially in determining color change. This method is also convenient for use in laboratory experiments because it is an inexpensive and relatively simple process.

== UV-visible spectrophotometry ==
Most spectrophotometers are used in the UV and visible regions of the spectrum, and some of these instruments also operate into the near-infrared region as well. The concentration of a protein can be estimated by measuring the OD at 280 nm due to the presence of tryptophan, tyrosine and phenylalanine. This method is not very accurate since the composition of proteins varies greatly and proteins with none of these amino acids do not have maximum absorption at 280 nm. Nucleic acid contamination can also interfere. This method requires a spectrophotometer capable of measuring in the UV region with quartz cuvettes.

Ultraviolet-visible (UV-vis) spectroscopy involves energy levels that excite electronic transitions. Absorption of UV-vis light excites molecules that are in ground-states to their excited-states.

Visible region 400–700 nm spectrophotometry is used extensively in colorimetry science. It is a known fact that it operates best at the range of 0.2–0.8 O.D. Ink manufacturers, printing companies, textiles vendors, and many more, need the data provided through colorimetry. They take readings in the region of every 5–20 nanometers along the visible region, and produce a spectral reflectance curve or a data stream for alternative presentations. These curves can be used to test a new batch of colorant to check if it makes a match to specifications, e.g., ISO printing standards.

Traditional visible region spectrophotometers cannot detect if a colorant or the base material has fluorescence. This can make it difficult to manage color issues if for example one or more of the printing inks is fluorescent. Where a colorant contains fluorescence, a bi-spectral fluorescent spectrophotometer is used. There are two major setups for visual spectrum spectrophotometers, d/8 (spherical) and 0/45. The names are due to the geometry of the light source, observer and interior of the measurement chamber. Scientists use this instrument to measure the amount of compounds in a sample. If the compound is more concentrated more light will be absorbed by the sample; within small ranges, the Beer–Lambert law holds and the absorbance between samples vary with concentration linearly. In the case of printing measurements two alternative settings are commonly used- without/with uv filter to control better the effect of uv brighteners within the paper stock.

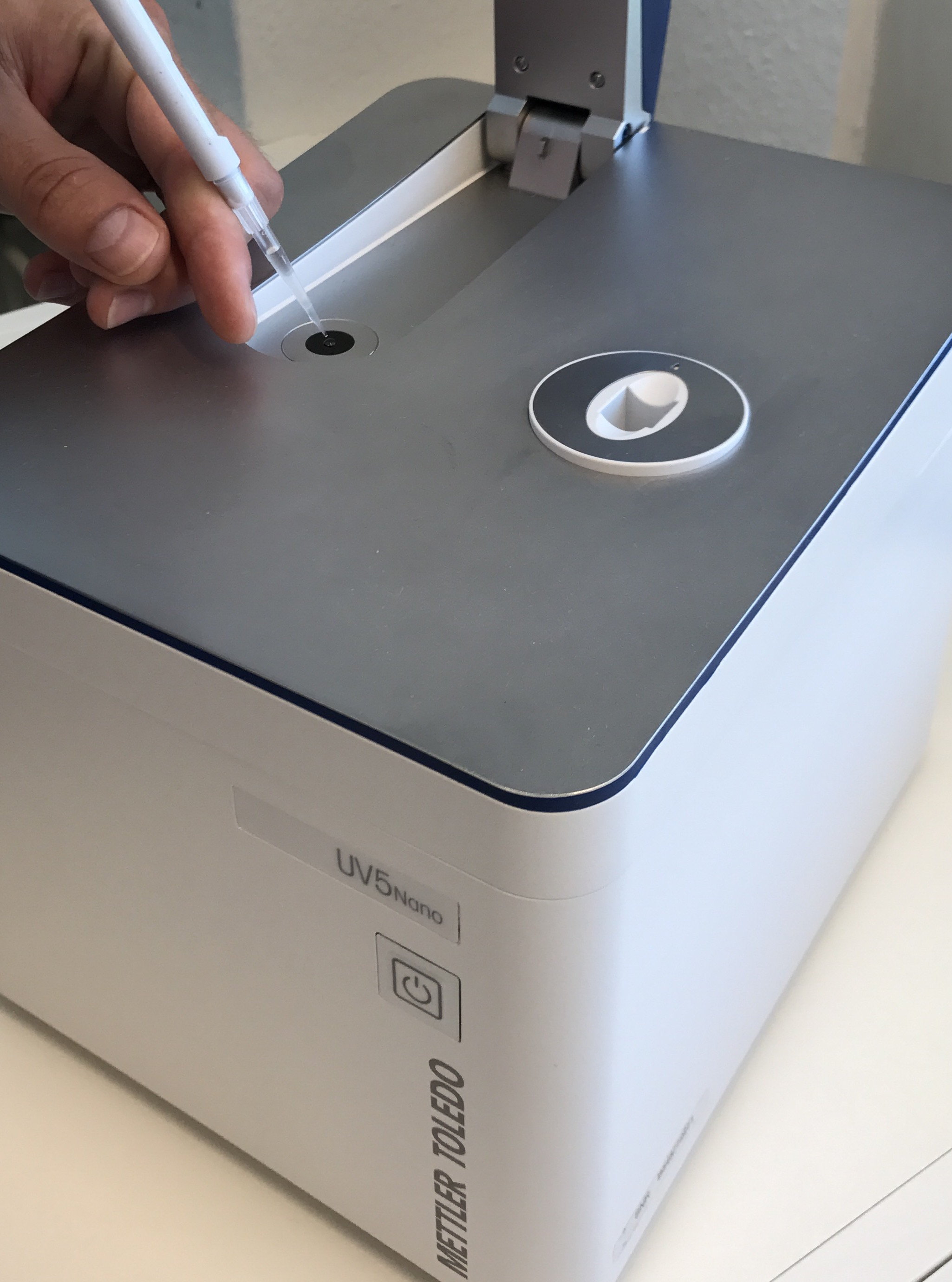
METTLER TOLEDO UV5Nano Micro-Volume Spectrophotometer

Samples are usually prepared in cuvettes; depending on the region of interest, they may be constructed of glass, plastic (visible spectrum region of interest), or quartz (Far UV spectrum region of interest). Some applications require small volume measurements which can be performed with micro-volume platforms.

=== Applications ===
- Estimating dissolved organic carbon concentration
- Specific ultraviolet absorbance for metric of aromaticity
- Bial's test for concentration of pentoses

=== Experimental application ===
As described in the applications section, spectrophotometry can be used in both qualitative and quantitative analysis of DNA, RNA, and proteins. Qualitative analysis can be used and spectrophotometers are used to record spectra of compounds by scanning broad wavelength regions to determine the absorbance properties (the intensity of the color) of the compound at each wavelength. One experiment that can demonstrate the various uses that visible spectrophotometry can have is the separation of β-galactosidase from a mixture of various proteins. Largely, spectrophotometry is best used to help quantify the amount of purification your sample has undergone relative to total protein concentration. By running an affinity chromatography, B-Galactosidase can be isolated and tested by reacting collected samples with Ortho-Nitrophenyl-β-galactoside (ONPG) and determining if the sample turns yellow. Following this testing the sample at 420 nm for specific interaction with ONPG and at 595 for a Bradford Assay the amount of purification can be assessed quantitatively. In addition to this spectrophotometry can be used in tandem with other techniques such as SDS-Page electrophoresis in order to purify and isolate various protein samples.

== IR spectrophotometry ==
Spectrophotometers designed for the infrared region are quite different because of the technical requirements of measurement in that region. One major factor is the type of photosensors that are available for different spectral regions, but infrared measurement is also challenging because virtually everything emits IR as thermal radiation, especially at wavelengths beyond about 5 μm.

Another complication is that quite a few materials such as glass and plastic absorb infrared, making it incompatible as an optical medium. Ideal optical materials are salts, which do not absorb strongly. Samples for IR spectrophotometry may be smeared between two discs of potassium bromide or ground with potassium bromide and pressed into a pellet. Where aqueous solutions are to be measured, insoluble silver chloride is used to construct the cell.

== Spectroradiometers ==
Spectroradiometers, which operate almost like the visible region spectrophotometers, are designed to measure the spectral density of illuminants. Applications may include evaluation and categorization of lighting for sales by the manufacturer, or for the customers to confirm the lamp they decided to purchase is within their specifications. Components:

1. The light source shines onto or through the sample.
2. The sample transmits or reflects light.
3. The detector detects how much light was reflected from or transmitted through the sample.
4. The detector then converts how much light the sample transmitted or reflected into a number.

== Spectrophotometry in Print ==
To those involved in the graphics field, color is a property of the surface of a given object under a certain illumination or light source. In order to reproduce the same color or design, the sample color must be measured. This is where spectrophotometers come in.

Different types of spectrophotometers are used for different printing technologies. Offset presses use handheld and closed-loop scanning spectrophotometers. Flexo, rotogravure, screen printers, and digital presses use handheld and inline spectrophotometers.

The human eye, as well as the brain, can struggle with color perception/vision. Some individuals may experience color blindness, while others will notice that their eyes become strained and less apt to see color effectively as the day goes on.

To combat these issues, spectrophotometers can be used to measure color targets and control color strips. In the printing industry, the three types of spectrophotometers are: Handheld, handheld with informational displays, and automated.

Another device is a spectrodensitometer, which can calculate density readings from spectral values. From its definition, a spectrodensitometer is "A spectrally based densitometer that combines the functions of a spectrophotometer, colorimeter, and densitometer."

== See also ==
- Atomic absorption spectrophotometry
- Atomic emission spectroscopy
- Inductively coupled plasma atomic emission spectroscopy
- Inductively coupled plasma mass spectrometry
- LBOZ
- Microspectrophotometry
- Slope spectroscopy
- Spectroradiometry
