= Melanomorph =

Substance related to the pigment melanin

A melanomorph is a substance related to the pigment melanin. Melanomorphs originate from the aromatic amino acids tyrosine, tryptophan, and phenylalanine. They tend to absorb ultraviolet-B light, with peaks around 280 nanometers. See also Beer's Law.
