= Yorimitsu =

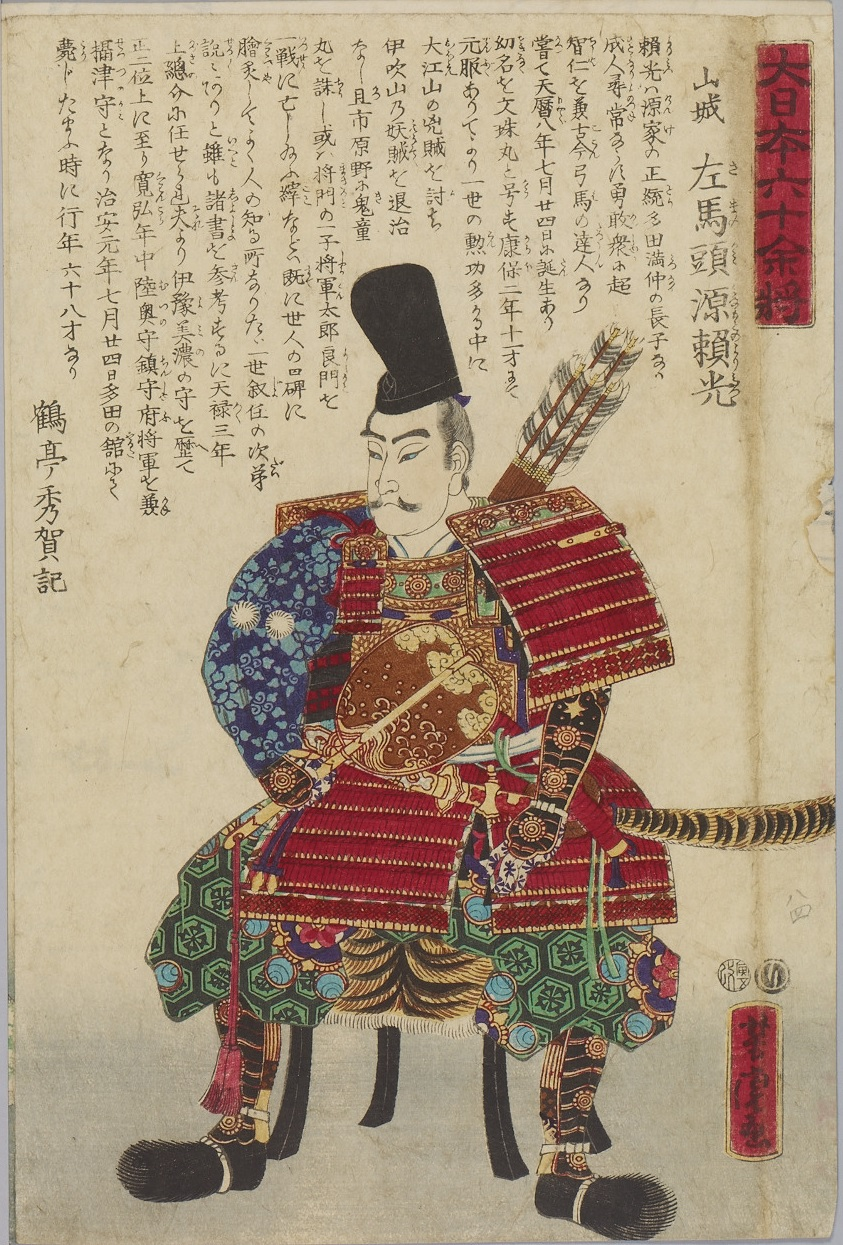
- Yorimitsu Minamoto (948–1021), Japanese warrior and character of folklore
- Pronunciation: joɾimitsɯ (IPA)
- Gender: Male

Origin
- Origin: Japanese
- Meaning: Different meanings depending on the kanji used

Other names
- Alternative spelling: Yorimitu (Kunrei-shiki) Yorimitu (Nihon-shiki) Yorimitsu (Hepburn)

Yorimitsu is a masculine Japanese given name.

== Written forms ==
Yorimitsu can be written using different combinations of kanji characters. Here are some examples:

- 頼光, "rely, light"
- 頼満, "rely, full"
- 依光, "to depend on, light"
- 依満, "to depend on, full"

The name can also be written in hiragana よりみつ or katakana ヨリミツ.

== Notable people with the name ==
- Yorimitsu Minamoto (源 頼光) (948–1021), Japanese warrior and character of folklore
- Yorimitsu Suwa (諏訪 頼満) (1480–1540), Japanese samurai and daimyō
