= August Beer =

German Jewish mathematician, physicist, and chemist (1825–1863)

August Beer (German: [beːɐ̯]; 31 July 1825 – 18 November 1863) was a German physicist, chemist, and mathematician of Jewish descent. Beer published a paper in the field of spectroscopy on the absorption of red light in colored aqueous solutions of various salts, which is extended on the work from Pierre Bouguer's and Johann Heinrich Lambert's absorption laws. He found that the intensity of light transmitted through a solution at a given wavelength decreases exponentially with the path length and the concentration of the solute, when the solvent is non-absorbing.

== Biography ==
Beer was born in Trier, where he studied mathematics and natural sciences. Beer was educated at the technical school and gymnasium of his native town until 1845, when he went to Bonn to study mathematics and the sciences under the mathematician and physicist Julius Plücker, whose assistant he became later. In 1848 he won the prize for his essay, "De Situ Axium Opticorum in Crystallis Biaxibus," and obtained the degree of Ph.D. Two years later he was appointed lecturer at the University of Bonn.

In 1852, Beer published a paper on the absorption of red light in coloured aqueous solutions of various salts. Beer makes use of the fact, derived from Bouguer's and Lambert's absorption laws, that the intensity of light transmitted through a solution at a given wavelength decreases exponentially with the path length d and the concentration c of the solute (the solvent is considered non-absorbing). The “Absorption Coëfficient” that Beer defined is actually the transmittance (or transmission ratio), T = I / I_{0}. In Beer's formulation: "the transmittance of a concentrated solution can be derived from a measurement of the transmittance of a dilute solution."

The transmittance measured for any concentration and path length can be normalized to the corresponding transmittance for a standard concentration and path length. Beer conducted a number of experiments to confirm this empirical law, and to define a standard concentration of 10%, and a standard path length of 10 cm. The photometer, devised by Beer, is shown in the gallery below.

Beer continued to publish the results of his scientific labors, writing in 1854 Einleitung in die höhere Optik (Introduction to the Higher Optics). His findings, together with those of Johann Heinrich Lambert, make up the Beer–Lambert law. In 1855 he was appointed professor of mathematics at the University of Bonn. Beer also wrote "Einheit in der Electrostatik," published two years after his death. Many of Beer's works are praised in the context of his Jewish descent, as his work had lasting effects on modern-day mathematics and the Jewish community. He died in Bonn in 1863.

== Beer's law ==
Beer's law, also called the Beer–Lambert law, in spectroscopy, is the physical law stating that the quantity of light absorbed by a substance dissolved in a non-absorbing solvent is directly proportional to the concentration of the substance and the path length of the light through the solution. Beer's law is commonly written in the form

$$A = \varepsilon cl,$$

where A is the absorbance, c is the concentration in moles per liter, l is the path length in centimeters, and ε is a constant of proportionality known as the molar extinction coefficient. The law is accurate only for dilute solutions; deviations from the law occur in concentrated solutions because of interactions between molecules of the solute, the substance dissolved in the solvent.

== Gallery ==
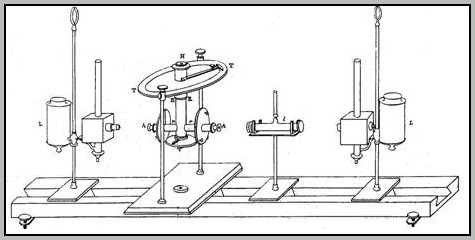
Photometer devised by Beer

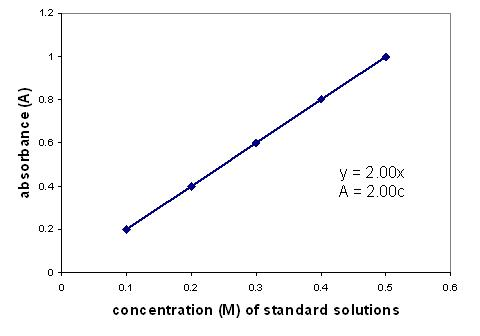
Example plot displaying the Beer–Lambert Law

== Selected writings ==
- Beer, August (1865). Einleitung in die Elektrostatik, die Lehre vom Magnetismus und die Elektrodynamik. Braunschweig: Friedrich Vieweg und Sohn.
