= Suva (disambiguation) =

Suva is the capital of Fiji.

Suva may also refer to:

- Suva (insurer), the Swiss National Accident Insurance Fund
- HMS Suva, a ship
- Specific ultraviolet absorbance, a measure of dissolved organic carbon in water
- Suva Planina, town in Serbia
- Suva Reka, town in Kosovo
- Suva River, Crni Timok (Bogovina), a tributary of the Crni Timok River near the village of Bogovina, Serbia
- Suva River, Crni Timok (Metovnica), a tributary of the Crni Timok River near the village of Metovnica, Serbia
