= Job plot =

Type of graph used in analytical chemistry

Within chemistry, a Job plot, otherwise known as the method of continuous variation or Job's method, is a method used in analytical chemistry to determine the stoichiometry of a binding event. The method is named after Paul Job and is also used in instrumental analysis and advanced chemical equilibrium texts and research articles. Job first published his method in 1928, while studying the associations of ions in solution. By plotting the UV absorbance of a solution of Tl(NO_{3})/NH_{3} against the mole fraction of Tl(NO_{3}), he produced a graph which provided information about the equilibrium complexes present in solution.

== Theory ==
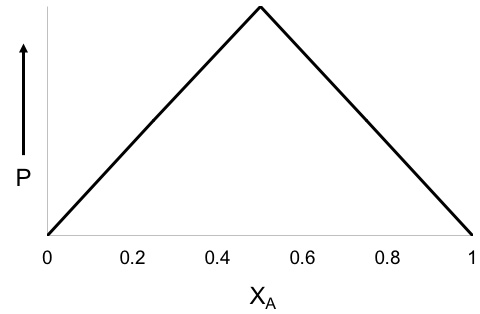
A simple Job Plot showing how a physical property (P) changes upon changing the mole fraction of compound A (Χ_{A}).

In solutions where two species are present (i.e. species A and species B), one species (A) may bind to the other species (B). In some cases, more than one A will bind with a single B. One way to determine the amount of A binding to B is by using a Job plot.

In this method, the sum of the molar concentrations of the two binding partners (e.g. a protein and ligand or a metal and a ligand) is held constant, but their mole fractions are varied. An observable that is proportional to complex formation (such as absorption signal or enzymatic activity) is plotted against the mole fractions of these two components.

χ_{A} is the mole fraction of compound A and P is the physical property being measured to understand complex formation. This property is most oftentimes UV absorbance.

The maximum (or minimum) on the plot corresponds to the stoichiometry of the two species if sufficiently high concentrations are used. The plot also provides insight to understand the equilibrium constant (K_{eq}) of complex formation. A greater curvature leads to a more evenly distributed equilibrium, while a more triangle-shaped plot signifies a large K_{eq}. Further, after determining the equilibrium constant, we can determine what complexes (ratio of A and B) are present in solution. In addition, the peak of the Job Plot corresponds to the mole fraction of ligands bound to a molecule, which is important for studying ligand field theory. An early work of I. Ostromisslensky describes essentially this approach.

== Requirements ==
There are several conditions that must be met in order for Job's method to be applicable. Firstly, the property being studied must vary in direct proportion to the concentration of the species. In the case of UV-visible spectroscopy, for example, this means that the system must conform to the Beer-Lambert law. In addition, the total concentration of the two binding partners, the pH and ionic strength of the solution must all be maintained at fixed values throughout the experiment.

Finally, there must be only one complex in solution which predominates over all others under the conditions of the experiment. This requirement means that only systems with high association constants, or systems in which only one stoichiometry can form, are suitable for analysis by Job plot. As such, the use of the Job plot in supramolecular chemistry has been advised against.
