= LBOZ =

Coefficient used in spectrophotometry

LBOZ is a coefficient used in spectrophotometry to estimate selectivity (amount of overlapping of spectra) in a quantitative manner. It is named after its creators: Lorber, Bergmann, von Oepen, and Zinn.

== Definition ==
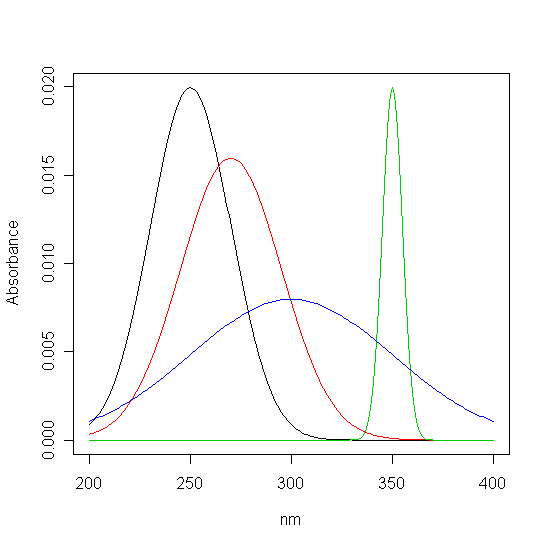
Sample synthetic spectra of four components

Let $\mathbf{X}$ be a matrix of the spectra (absorbances), where the k rows correspond to the components in mixture and n columns correspond to the sequence of wavelengths. The LBOZ criterion for kth component is calculated from the following formula:

$$\xi_k = \frac{1}{\|\mathbf{X}_{k-row}\| \|\mathbf{X}^{+}_{k-col}\|}$$

where $\mathbf{X}^{+}$ means a pseudoinverse of the matrix and $\| \cdots \|$ means an euclidean length of a vector.

== Properties ==
The image above show synthetic Gaussian spectra. The LBOZ criteria are: 0.561 for black compound, 0.402 for red compound, 0.899 for green and 0.549 for blue. LBOZ always lie in range <0,1> and has strong mathematical sense – it presents the amount of spectral signal which is not overlapped by the others. Hence, the uncertainty of a compound quantity increases by $1/\xi$ in presence of the other compounds. In this case, the highest uncertainty is expected during determination of red compound – theoretically 2.38 times greater than during determination of its compound alone.
