= Suwa Yorimitsu =

Suwa Yorimitsu (諏訪 頼満) (1480–1540) was a warlord of the Shinano Province. The region that was controlled by Yorimitsu was Lake Suwa. During the year of 1485, Yorimitsu's father was killed by his own retainers for unknown reasons. But Yorimitsu in the end was a very capable leader, greatly strengthening the domain of Suwa.
