= Specific ultraviolet absorbance =

Specific ultraviolet absorbance (SUVA) is the absorbance of ultraviolet light in a water sample at a specified wavelength that is normalized for dissolved organic carbon (DOC) concentration. Specific UV absorbance (SUVA) wavelengths have analytical uses to measure the aromatic character of dissolved organic matter by detecting density of electron conjugation which is associated with aromatic bonds.

== Derivation ==
To derive SUVA, first, UVC light (UV spectrum subtypes) at 254 nm or 280 nm, is measured in units of absorbance per meter of path length, often the sample must be diluted with ultrapure water because absorbance can be high. As increasing dissolved organic carbon concentration increases absorbance in the UV range, the UV light has to be normalized to the concentration of dissolved organic carbon in mg per L to ascertain differences in the aromatic quality of the water.

Aromatic character is used in the study of dissolved organic matter, from mineral soils, or organic soils, to use as an assay to whether or not dissolved organic carbon in the water is labile, a ready source of energy, or is from a relatively old source of carbon (recalcitrant). However, although a good indicator of aromaticity, caution must be used with determination of reactivity.

Measures of water purity often rely on measuring turbidity, not aromaticity.
