= Suwa Province =

Former province of Japan

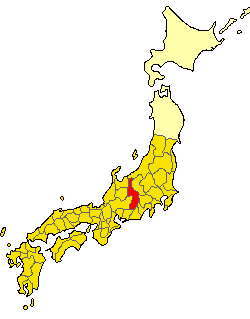
Location of Suwa Province (721)

Suwa Prefecture (諏訪国, Suwa no Kuni; Japanese pronunciation: [sɨ̀.β̞ä́ (nó̞ kɯ̈́.ɲ̟í), sɨ́.β̞ä̀ (nò̞ kɯ̈̀.ɲ̟ì)]) is an old province in the area of Nagano Prefecture.

It was located in the Tōsandō region of central Honshu. According to the old history book Shoku Nihongi, it was established on June 26 of 721 and abolished on March 3 of 731 (old Japanese calendar's date). Neither the location of the capital nor the exact border with Shinano is known.

== Historical districts ==
Suwa Province consisted of three districts (originally two):

- Nagano Prefecture
  - Ina District (伊那郡): split to become Kamiina and Shimoina Districts
  - Suwa District (諏訪郡)

== Gallery ==
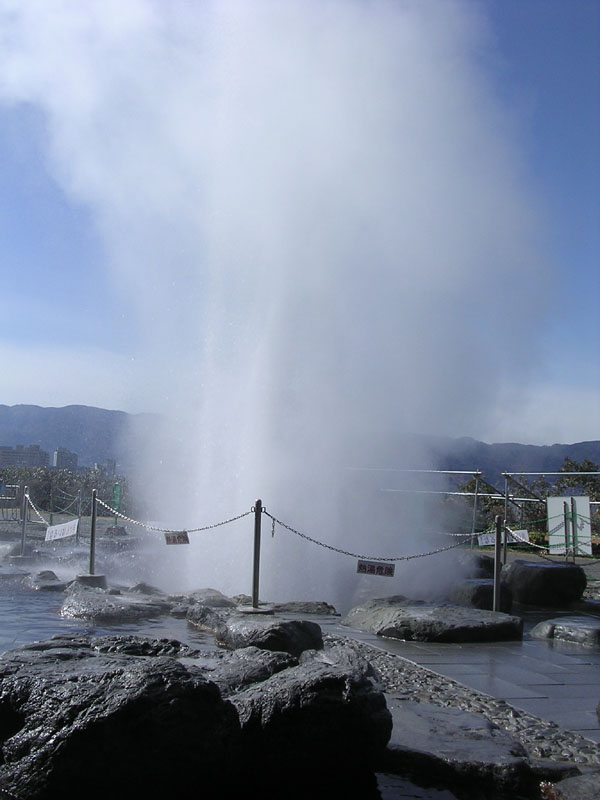
Geyser in Kamisuwa (上諏訪), Nagano Prefecture

== See also ==
- Lake Suwa
- Suwa taisha
- Suwa, Nagano
