= Molar absorption coefficient =

Measure of how strongly a chemical species absorbs a given wavelength of light

In chemistry, the molar absorption coefficient or molar attenuation coefficient (ε) is a measurement of how strongly a chemical species absorbs, and thereby attenuates, light at a given wavelength. It is an intrinsic property of the species. The SI unit of molar absorption coefficient is the square metre per mole (m^{2}/mol), but in practice, quantities are usually expressed in terms of M^{−1}⋅cm^{−1} or L⋅mol^{−1}⋅cm^{−1} (the latter two units are both equal to 0.1 m^{2}/mol). In older literature, the cm^{2}/mol is sometimes used; 1 M^{−1}⋅cm^{−1} equals 1000 cm^{2}/mol. The molar absorption coefficient is also known as the molar extinction coefficient and molar absorptivity, but the use of these alternative terms has been discouraged by the IUPAC.

== Beer–Lambert law ==
The absorbance of a material that has only one absorbing species also depends on the pathlength and the concentration of the species, according to the Beer–Lambert law

$$A = \varepsilon c\ell,$$

where

- ε is the molar absorption coefficient of that material;
- c is the molar concentration of those species;
- ℓ is the path length.

Different disciplines have different conventions as to whether absorbance is decadic (10-based) or Napierian (e-based), i.e., defined with respect to the transmission via common logarithm (log_{10}) or a natural logarithm (ln). The molar absorption coefficient is usually decadic. When ambiguity exists, it is important to indicate which one applies.

When there are N absorbing species in a solution, the overall absorbance is the sum of the absorbances for each individual species i:

$$A = \sum_{i = 1}^N A_i = \ell \sum_{i = 1}^N \varepsilon_i c_i.$$

The composition of a mixture of N absorbing species can be found by measuring the absorbance at N wavelengths (the values of the molar absorption coefficient for each species at these wavelengths must also be known). The wavelengths chosen are usually the wavelengths of maximum absorption (absorbance maxima) for the individual species. None of the wavelengths may be an isosbestic point for a pair of species. The set of the following simultaneous equations can be solved to find the concentrations of each absorbing species:

$$\begin{cases}
A(\lambda_1) = \ell\sum_{i=1}^N \varepsilon_i(\lambda_1) c_i,\\
\ldots\\
A(\lambda_N) = \ell\sum_{i=1}^N \varepsilon_i(\lambda_N) c_i.\\
\end{cases}$$

The molar absorption coefficient (in units of M^{−1}cm^{−1}) is directly related to the attenuation cross section (in units of cm^{2}) via the Avogadro constant N_{A}:

$$\sigma = \ln(10) \frac{10^3}{N_\text{A}} \varepsilon \approx 3.823 532 16 \times 10^{-21}\,\varepsilon.$$

== Mass absorption coefficient ==
The mass absorption coefficient is equal to the molar absorption coefficient divided by the molar mass of the absorbing species.

ε_{m} = ε/M

where

- ε_{m} = Mass absorption coefficient
- ε = Molar absorption coefficient
- M = Molar mass of the absorbing species

== Proteins ==
In biochemistry, the molar absorption coefficient of a protein at 280 nm depends almost exclusively on the number of aromatic residues, particularly tryptophan, and can be predicted from the sequence of amino acids. Similarly, the molar absorption coefficient of nucleic acids at 260 nm can be predicted given the nucleotide sequence.

If the molar absorption coefficient is known, it can be used to determine the concentration of a protein in solution.
