= Beer–Lambert law =

Scientific law describing absorption of light

The Beer–Lambert law (also known as Beer's law) is used to determine the concentration of substances in a solution. It describes how the amount of light that a solution absorbs is directly proportional to the solution's concentration. This relationship is commonly expressed as

$$A = \varepsilon cl$$

where

- A is the absorbance
- ε is the absorption coefficient
- c is the concentration of the absorbing substance
- l is the path length

It is named after August Beer and Johann Heinrich Lambert. Forms of the law date back to the mid-eighteenth century, but it only took its modern form during the early twentieth century.

== History ==
The first work towards the law began with astronomical observations Pierre Bouguer performed in the early eighteenth century and published in 1729. Bouguer needed to compensate for the refraction of light by the earth's atmosphere, and found it necessary to measure the local height of the atmosphere. The latter, he sought to obtain through variations in the observed intensity of known stars. When calibrating this effect, Bouguer discovered that light intensity had an exponential dependence on length traveled through the atmosphere (in Bouguer's terms, a geometric progression).

Bouguer's work was then popularized in Johann Heinrich Lambert's Photometria in 1760. Lambert expressed the law, which states that the loss of light intensity when it propagates in a medium is directly proportional to intensity and path length, in a mathematical form quite similar to that used in modern physics. Lambert began by assuming that the intensity I of light traveling into an absorbing body would be given by the differential equation
$$-\mathrm{d}I=\mu I \mathrm{d}x,$$
which is compatible with Bouguer's observations. The constant of proportionality μ was often termed the "optical density" of the body. As long as μ is constant along a distance d, the exponential attenuation law,
$$I=I_0 e^{-\mu d}$$
follows from integration.

In 1852, August Beer noticed that colored solutions also appeared to exhibit a similar attenuation relation. In his analysis, Beer does not discuss Bouguer and Lambert's prior work, writing in his introduction that "Concerning the absolute magnitude of the absorption that a particular ray of light suffers during its propagation through an absorbing medium, there is no information available." Beer may have omitted reference to Bouguer's work because there is a subtle physical difference between color absorption in solutions and astronomical contexts. Solutions are homogeneous and do not scatter light at common analytical wavelengths (ultraviolet, visible, or infrared), except at entry and exit. Thus light within a solution is reasonably approximated as due to absorption alone. In Bouguer's context, atmospheric dust or other inhomogeneities could also scatter light away from the detector. Modern texts combine the two laws because scattering and absorption have the same effect. Thus a scattering coefficient μ_{s} and an absorption coefficient μ_{a} can be combined into a total extinction coefficient μ = μ_{s} + μ_{a}.

Importantly, Beer also seems to have conceptualized his result in terms of a given thickness' opacity, writing "If λ is the coefficient (fraction) of diminution, then this coefficient (fraction) will have the value λ^{2} for double this thickness." Although this geometric progression is mathematically equivalent to the modern law, modern treatments instead emphasize the logarithm of λ, which clarifies that concentration and path length have equivalent effects on the absorption. An early, possibly the first, modern formulation was given by Robert Luther and Andreas Nikolopulos in 1913.

== Mathematical formulations ==
There are several equivalent formulations of the law, depending on the precise choice of measured quantities. All of them state that, provided that the physical state is held constant, the extinction process is linear in the intensity of radiation and amount of radiatively-active matter, a fact sometimes called the fundamental law of extinction. Many of them then connect the quantity of radiatively-active matter to a length traveled ℓ and a concentration c or number density n. For concentrations expressed as moles per volume, the latter two are related by Avogadro's number: n = N_{A}c.

A collimated beam (directed radiation) with cross-sectional area S will encounter Sℓn particles (on average) during its travel. However, not all of these particles interact with the beam. Propensity to interact is a material-dependent property, typically summarized in absorptivity ϵ or scattering cross-section σ. These almost exhibit another Avogadro-type relationship: ln(10)ε = N_{A}σ. The factor of ln(10) appears because physicists tend to use natural logarithms and chemists decadal logarithms.

Beam intensity can also be described in terms of multiple variables: the intensity I or radiant flux Φ. In the case of a collimated beam, these are related by Φ = IS, but Φ is often used in non-collimated contexts. The ratio of intensity (or flux) in to out is sometimes summarized as a transmittance coefficient T = I/I_{0}.

When considering an extinction law, dimensional analysis can verify the consistency of the variables, as logarithms (being nonlinear) must always be dimensionless.

=== Formulation ===
The simplest formulation of Beer's relates the optical attenuation of a physical material containing a single attenuating species of uniform concentration to the optical path length through the sample and absorptivity of the species. This expression is:
$$\log_{10} (I_0/I)=A=\varepsilon \ell c$$
The quantities so equated are defined to be the absorbance A, which depends on the logarithm base. The Naperian absorbance τ is then given by τ = ln(10)A and satisfies
$$\ln(I_0/I)=\tau=\sigma\ell n.$$

If multiple species in the material interact with the radiation, then their absorbances add. Thus a slightly more general formulation is that
$$\begin{align}
\tau &= \ell\sum_i \sigma_i n_i, \\[4pt]
A &= \ell\sum_i \varepsilon_i c_i,
\end{align}$$
where the sum is over all possible radiation-interacting ("translucent") species, and i indexes those species.

In situations where length may vary significantly, absorbance is sometimes summarized in terms of an attenuation coefficient
$$\begin{alignat}{3}
\mu_{10}&=\frac{A}{l}&&=\epsilon c \\
\mu&=\frac{\tau}{l}&&=\sigma n.
\end{alignat}$$

In atmospheric science and radiation shielding applications, the attenuation coefficient may vary significantly through an inhomogenous material. In those situations, the most general form of the Beer–Lambert law states that the total attenuation can be obtained by integrating the attenuation coefficient over small slices dz of the beamline:
$$\begin{alignat}{3}
A&=\int{\mu_{10}(z)\,dz}&&=\int{\sum_i{\epsilon_i(z)c_i(z)}\,dz}, \\
\tau&=\int{\mu(z)\,dz}&&=\int{\sum_i{\sigma_i(z)n_i(z)}\,dz}.
\end{alignat}$$
These formulations then reduce to the simpler versions when there is only one active species and the attenuation coefficients are constant.

== Derivation ==
There are two factors that determine the degree to which a medium containing particles will attenuate a light beam: the number of particles encountered by the light beam, and the degree to which each particle extinguishes the light.

Assume that a beam of light enters a material sample. Define z as an axis parallel to the direction of the beam. Divide the material sample into thin slices, perpendicular to the beam of light, with thickness dz sufficiently small that one particle in a slice cannot obscure another particle in the same slice when viewed along the z direction. The radiant flux of the light that emerges from a slice is reduced, compared to that of the light that entered, by $\mathrm{d\Phi_e}(z) = -\mu(z)\Phi_\mathrm{e}(z) \mathrm{d}z,$ where μ is the (Napierian) attenuation coefficient, which yields the following first-order linear, ordinary differential equation:
$$\frac{\mathrm{d}\Phi_\mathrm{e}(z)}{\mathrm{d}z} = -\mu(z)\Phi_\mathrm{e}(z).$$
The attenuation is caused by the photons that did not make it to the other side of the slice because of scattering or absorption. The solution to this differential equation is obtained by multiplying the integrating factor
$$\exp\left(\int_0^z \mu(z')\mathrm{d}z' \right)$$
throughout to obtain
$$\frac{\mathrm{d}\Phi_\mathrm{e}(z)}{\mathrm{d}z}\, \exp\left(\int_0^z \mu(z')\mathrm{d}z' \right) + \mu(z)\Phi_\mathrm{e}(z)\, \exp\left(\int_0^z \mu(z')\mathrm{d}z' \right) = 0,$$
which simplifies due to the product rule (applied backwards) to
$$\frac{\mathrm{d}}{\mathrm{d}z}\left[\Phi_\mathrm{e}(z) \exp\left(\int_0^z \mu(z')\mathrm{d}z' \right)\right] = 0.$$

Integrating both sides and solving for Φ_{e} for a material of real thickness ℓ, with the incident radiant flux upon the slice $\mathrm{\Phi_e^i} = \mathrm{\Phi_e}(0)$ and the transmitted radiant flux $\mathrm{\Phi_e^t} = \mathrm{\Phi_e}(\ell)$ gives
$$\mathrm{\Phi_e^t} = \mathrm{\Phi_e^i} \exp\left(-\int_0^\ell \mu(z)\mathrm{d}z \right),$$
and finally
$$T = \mathrm{\frac{\Phi_e^t}{\Phi_e^i}} = \exp\left(-\int_0^\ell \mu(z)\mathrm{d}z \right).$$

Since the decadic attenuation coefficient μ_{10} is related to the (Napierian) attenuation coefficient by $\mu_{10} = \tfrac{\mu}{\ln 10},$ we also have
$$\begin{align}
T &= \exp\left(-\int_0^\ell \ln(10)\,\mu_{10}(z)\mathrm{d}z \right) \\[4pt]
&= 10^{\;\!\wedge} \!\! \left( -\int_0^\ell \mu_{10}(z)\mathrm{d}z \right).
\end{align}$$

To describe the attenuation coefficient in a way independent of the number densities n_{i} of the N attenuating species of the material sample, one introduces the attenuation cross section $\sigma_i = \tfrac{\mu_i(z)}{n_i(z)}.$ σ_{i} has the dimension of an area; it expresses the likelihood of interaction between the particles of the beam and the particles of the species i in the material sample:
$$T = \exp\left(-\sum_{i = 1}^N \sigma_i \int_0^\ell n_i(z)\mathrm{d}z \right).$$

One can also use the molar attenuation coefficients $\varepsilon_i = \tfrac{\mathrm{N_A}}{\ln 10}\sigma_i,$ where N_{A} is the Avogadro constant, to describe the attenuation coefficient in a way independent of the amount concentrations $c_i(z) = n_i \tfrac{z}{\mathrm{N_A}}$ of the attenuating species of the material sample:
$$\begin{align}
T &= \exp\left(-\sum_{i = 1}^N \frac{\ln(10)}{\mathrm{N_A}}\varepsilon_i \int_0^\ell n_i(z)\mathrm{d}z \right) \\[4pt]
&= \exp\left(-\sum_{i = 1}^N \varepsilon_i \int_0^\ell \frac{n_i(z)}{\mathrm{N_A}}\mathrm{d}z\right)^{\ln(10)} \\[4pt]
&= 10^{\;\!\wedge} \!\! \left(-\sum_{i = 1}^N \varepsilon_i \int_0^\ell c_i(z)\mathrm{d}z \right).
\end{align}$$

=== Validity ===
Under certain conditions the Beer–Lambert law fails to maintain a linear relationship between attenuation and concentration of analyte, particularly at high concentrations where scattering and turbidity become significant.

These deviations are classified into three categories:

1. Real—fundamental deviations due to the limitations of the law itself.
2. Chemical—deviations observed due to specific chemical species of the sample which is being analyzed.
3. Instrument—deviations which occur due to how the attenuation measurements are made.

There are at least six conditions that need to be fulfilled in order for the Beer–Lambert law to be valid. These are:

1. The attenuators must act independently of each other.
2. The attenuating medium must be homogeneous in the interaction volume.
3. The attenuating medium must not scatter the radiation—no turbidity—unless this is accounted for as in DOAS.
4. The incident radiation must consist of parallel rays, each traversing the same length in the absorbing medium.
5. The incident radiation should preferably be monochromatic, or have at least a width that is narrower than that of the attenuating transition. Otherwise, a spectrometer as a detector for the power is needed instead of a photodiode, which cannot discriminate between wavelengths.
6. The incident flux must not influence the atoms or molecules; it should only act as a non-invasive probe of the species under study. In particular, this implies that the light should not cause optical saturation or optical pumping, since such effects will deplete the lower level and possibly give rise to stimulated emission.

If any of these conditions are not fulfilled, there will be deviations from the Beer–Lambert law.

The law tends to break down at very high concentrations, especially if the material is highly scattering. Absorbance within range of 0.2 to 0.5 is ideal to maintain linearity in the Beer–Lambert law. If the radiation is especially intense, nonlinear optical processes can also cause variances. The main reason, however, is that the concentration dependence is in general non-linear and Beer's law is valid only under certain conditions as shown by derivation below. For strong oscillators and at high concentrations the deviations are stronger. If the molecules are closer to each other interactions can set in. These interactions can be roughly divided into physical and chemical interactions. Physical interaction do not alter the polarizability of the molecules as long as the interaction is not so strong that light and molecular quantum state intermix (strong coupling), but cause the attenuation cross sections to be non-additive via electromagnetic coupling. Chemical interactions in contrast change the polarizability and thus absorption.

In solids, attenuation is usually an addition of absorption coefficient $\alpha$ (creation of electron-hole pairs) or scattering (for example Rayleigh scattering if the scattering centers are much smaller than the incident wavelength). Also note that for some systems we can put $1/\lambda$ (1 over inelastic mean free path) in place of $\mu$.

== Applications ==
=== In plasma physics ===
Like solutions, the Beer–Lambert Law can also be applied to plasmas. Here, the absorption coefficient is typically expressed as $\alpha(\lambda)=n\sigma(\lambda)$ where $n$ is the number density of the absorbing species and $\sigma(\lambda)$ is the wavelength-dependent absorption cross-section. Substitution into the Beer-Lambert Law yields:

$$\ln(I_0/I)=\int n(s)\sigma(\lambda)\operatorname{d}\!s$$

which relates the measured attenuation to the line-integrated number density along the optical path. This formula underpins many laser absorption spectroscopy techniques, including tunable diode laser and quantum cascade laser absorption spectorscopy, which can be used to determine absolute densities, temperatures, and bulk flow velocities in laboratory, industrial, and fusion plasmas.

In hotter or denser plasmas, such as stellar atmospheres, many atomic and ionic species contribute simultaneously, often with multiple coexisting ionisation states; therefore, treating the absorption as a sum of individual particle cross-sections becomes impractical. Instead, the Beer-Lambert Law is commonly written in terms of the effective opacity $\kappa_\nu$, which encompasses all the microscopic processes at a given frequency:

$$I_\nu = I_{\nu,0}\exp\!\left(-\int \kappa_\nu \rho\,\mathrm{d}s\right)$$

where $I_{\nu,0}$ and $I_\nu$ are the incident and transmitted spectral intensities, $\rho$ is the mass density, and the integral is taken along the line of sight; this represents the absorption-only limit of the radiative transfer equation. Although the Beer-Lambert Law is most accurate for optically thin or moderately absorbing plasmas, it remains a fundamental approximation for interpreting absorption measurements in plasma diagnostics.

The law also arises as a solution to the BGK equation.

=== Chemical analysis by spectrophotometry ===
The Beer–Lambert law can be applied to the analysis of a mixture by spectrophotometry, without the need for extensive pre-processing of the sample. An example is the determination of bilirubin in blood plasma samples. The spectrum of pure bilirubin is known, so the molar attenuation coefficient ε is known. Measurements of decadic attenuation coefficient μ_{10} are made at one wavelength λ that is nearly unique for bilirubin and at a second wavelength in order to correct for possible interferences. The amount concentration c is then given by
$$c = \frac{\mu_{10}(\lambda)}{\varepsilon(\lambda)}.$$

For a more complicated example, consider a mixture in solution containing two species at amount concentrations c_{1} and c_{2}. The decadic attenuation coefficient at any wavelength λ is, given by
$$\mu_{10}(\lambda) = \varepsilon_1(\lambda) c_1 + \varepsilon_2(\lambda) c_2.$$

Therefore, measurements at two wavelengths yields two equations in two unknowns and will suffice to determine the amount concentrations c_{1} and c_{2} as long as the molar attenuation coefficients of the two components, ε_{1} and ε_{2} are known at both wavelengths. This two system equation can be solved using Cramer's rule. In practice it is better to use linear least squares to determine the two amount concentrations from measurements made at more than two wavelengths.

Mixtures containing more than two components can be analyzed in the same way, using a minimum of m wavelengths for a mixture containing n components. So, in general:

$$A_{\lambda_i} = \sum_{j=1}^{n} \epsilon_{j, \lambda_i} c_j l$$

where $A_{\lambda_i}$is the absorbance at wavelength $\lambda_i$, $\epsilon_{j, \lambda_i}$ is the molar absorptivity of component $j$ at $\lambda_i$, $c_j$ is the concentration of component $j$, and $l$ is the path length.

The law is used widely in infra-red spectroscopy and near-infrared spectroscopy for analysis of polymer degradation and oxidation (also in biological tissue) as well as to measure the concentration of various compounds in different food samples. The carbonyl group attenuation at about 6 micrometres can be detected quite easily, and degree of oxidation of the polymer calculated.

=== In-atmosphere astronomy ===
The Bouguer–Lambert law may be applied to describe the attenuation of solar or stellar radiation as it travels through the atmosphere. In this case, there is scattering of radiation as well as absorption. The optical depth for a slant path is τ′ = mτ, where τ refers to a vertical path, m is called the relative airmass, and for a plane-parallel atmosphere it is determined as m = sec θ where θ is the zenith angle corresponding to the given path. The Bouguer-Lambert law for the atmosphere is usually written
$$T = \exp \big( -m(\tau_\mathrm{a} + \tau_\mathrm{g} + \tau_\mathrm{RS} + \tau_\mathrm{NO_2} + \tau_\mathrm{w} + \tau_\mathrm{O_3} + \tau_\mathrm{r} + \cdots) \bigr),$$
where each τ_{x} is the optical depth whose subscript identifies the source of the absorption or scattering it describes:

- a refers to aerosols (that absorb and scatter);
- g are uniformly mixed gases (mainly carbon dioxide (CO_{2}) and molecular oxygen (O_{2}) which only absorb);
- NO_{2} is nitrogen dioxide, mainly due to urban pollution (absorption only);
- RS are effects due to Raman scattering in the atmosphere;
- w is water vapour absorption;
- O_{3} is ozone (absorption only);
- r is Rayleigh scattering from molecular oxygen (O_{2}) and nitrogen (N_{2}) (responsible for the blue color of the sky);
- the selection of the attenuators which have to be considered depends on the wavelength range and can include various other compounds. This can include tetraoxygen, HONO, formaldehyde, glyoxal, a series of halogen radicals and others.

m is the optical mass or airmass factor, a term approximately equal (for small and moderate values of θ) to $\tfrac{1}{\cos \theta},$ where θ is the observed object's zenith angle (the angle measured from the direction perpendicular to the Earth's surface at the observation site). This equation can be used to retrieve τ_{a}, the aerosol optical thickness, which is necessary for the correction of satellite images and also important in accounting for the role of aerosols in climate.

== See also ==
- Applied spectroscopy
- Atomic absorption spectroscopy
- Absorption spectroscopy
- Cavity ring-down spectroscopy
- Clausius–Mossotti relation
- Infra-red spectroscopy
- Job plot
- Laser absorption spectrometry
- Lorentz–Lorenz relation
- Logarithm
- Polymer degradation
- Scientific laws named after people
- Quantification of nucleic acids
- Tunable diode laser absorption spectroscopy
- Transmittance § Beer–Lambert law
