= IRsweep =

Swiss company

- Type: Corporation
- Industry: Test and measurement, Sensing technology
- Founded: 2014
- Founders: Markus Mangold, PhD; Andreas Hugi, PhD; Markus Geiser, PhD
- Headquarters: Stäfa, Switzerland
- Area served: Worldwide
- Products: IRis-F1; IRcell-S
- Services: Optical Sensing Technology
- Parent: Sensirion Holding
- Website: irsweep.com

IRsweep is a Swiss company offering optical spectroscopy solutions and multipass absorption cells.

The spectroscopy is based on semiconductor quantum cascade laser frequency combs in the mid-infrared wavelength range. The company is based in Zurich, Switzerland and was founded in 2014 and acquired by Sensirion Holding in May 2021.

The technology is used for high speed absorption measurements of different molecules and is robust against cross-sensitivities. Such sensor systems are in high demand for process analytics as well as research applications, as the mid-infrared range hosts the strongest absorption features of many molecules.

== History ==
IRsweep was founded in 2014 as a spin-off from the Swiss Federal Institute of Technology (ETH Zurich). The company commercialized its first product after having developed its prototypes for academic research projects. The first derived product is the IRcell, a cylindrical multipass cell combining a long optical path in a small detection volume.

== See also ==
- Infrared spectroscopy
