= Noise-immune cavity-enhanced optical heterodyne molecular spectroscopy =

Noise-immune cavity-enhanced optical-heterodyne molecular spectroscopy (NICE-OHMS) is an ultra-sensitive laser-based absorption technique that utilizes laser light to assess the concentration or the amount of a species in gas phase by absorption spectrometry (AS).

== Principles ==
The NICE-OHMS technique combines cavity enhanced absorption spectrometry (CEAS) for prolonged interaction length with the sample with frequency modulation (fm) spectrometry FMS for reduction of 1/f noise. By choosing the fm-modulation frequency equal to the free spectral range (FSR) of the cavity, all components of the spectral fm-triplet are transmitted through the cavity in an identical manner. Therefore, the cavity does not compromise the balance of the fm-triplet, which otherwise would give rise to fm-background signals. It also does not convert any fluctuations of the laser frequency with respect to the transmission mode of the cavity to intensity modulation, which would deteriorate the detectability by the introduction of intensity noise. This is referred to as "noise immunity". All this implies that FMS can be performed as if the cavity were not present, yet fully benefiting from the prolonged interaction length.

=== Types of signals ===
A variety of signals can be obtained by NICE-OHMS. First, due to the presence of high intensity counter-propagating beams in the cavity, both Doppler-broadened and Doppler-free signals can be obtained. The former have the advantage of being present at high intracavity pressures, which is suitable when atmospheric pressure samples are analyzed, whereas the latter provide narrow frequency features, which is of importance for frequency standard applications, but also opens up possibilities for interference-free detection. Second, due to the use of FMS, both absorption and dispersion signals can be detected (or a combination thereof). Third, to reduce the influence of low frequency noise, wavelength modulation (wm) can additionally be applied, which implies that the technique can be operated in either fm or wm mode.

The mode of operation to be preferred depends on the particular application of the technique and on the prevailing experimental conditions, mainly the type of noise or background signal that limits the detectability.

=== Modeling of signals ===
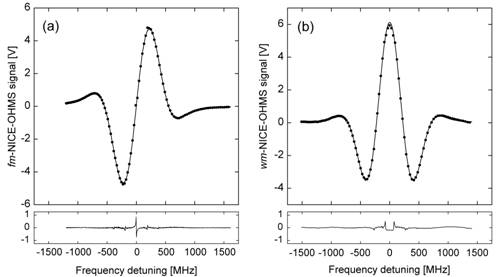
Typical (a) frequency modulated and (b) wavelength modulated Doppler-broadened NICE-OHMS signals from 13 ppb (10 μTorr, 13•10^{−9} atm) of C_{2}H_{2}. Individual markers: measured data; Solid curves: theoretical fits.

Frequency modulated Doppler-broadened signals can be modeled basically as ordinary fm-signals, although an extended description has to be used if the transition is optically saturated. Wavelength modulated Doppler broadened can be modeled by applying the conventional theory for wavelength modulation on the fm-signals.

Since the electrical field in NICE-OHMS consists of three modes, a carrier and two sidebands, which propagate in positive and negative directions in the cavity, up to nine sub-Doppler signals can appear; four appearing at the absorption and five at the dispersion phase. Each of these signals can, in turn, originate from interactions between several groups of molecules with various pairs of modes (e.g. carrier-carrier, sideband-carrier, sideband-sideband in various combinations). In addition, since sub-Doppler signals necessarily involve optical saturation, each of these interactions has to be modeled by a more extensive description. This implies that the situation can be complex. In fact, there are still some types of sub-Doppler signals for which there so far are no adequate theoretical description.

=== Typical signals ===
Some typical Doppler-broadened NICE-OHMS signals, from 13 ppb (10 μTorr, 13•10^{−9} atm) of C_{2}H_{2} detected in a cavity with a finesse of 4800, are shown in the figure. (a) fm- and (b) wm-signal. Individual markers: measured data; Solid curves: theoretical fits.

== Performance ==
The unique features of NICE-OHMS, in particular its high sensitivity, imply that it has a large potential for a variety of applications. First developed for frequency standard applications, with an astonishing detectability of 10^{−14} cm^{−1}, it has later been used for spectroscopic investigations as well as chemical sensing and trace species detection, with detectabilities in the 10^{−11} - 10^{−10} cm^{−1} range. However, although the NICE-OHMS technique has shown to possess an extremely high detectability, it has so far only sparsely been developed towards trace gas analysis.

One of the biggest hurdles for implementation of the NICE-OHMS technique is indisputably the locking of the frequency of the laser to that of a cavity mode. Although the requirements for the performance of the lock are less stringent than for other direct cw-CEAS techniques (due to the noise-immune principle), the laser frequency still has to be kept locked within the cavity mode during signal acquisition, i.e. it should follow the mode while the cavity is scanned, including a possible wavelength modulation. It can be difficult to achieve these goals if the free-running linewidth of the laser is significantly larger than the cavity mode width and if the laser is prone to sudden frequency excursions due to technical noise from the surroundings. This is usually the case when working with medium- or high finesse cavities (with transmission mode widths in the low kHz range) and standard types of lasers, e.g. external cavity diode lasers (ECDLs), with free-running linewidths in the MHz range. Electronic feedback loops with high bandwidths (typically a few MHz) and high gain are then needed to couple a substantial amount of the laser power into a cavity mode and to ensure stable performance of the lock.

With the advent of narrow linewidth fiber lasers, the problems connected to laser locking can be significantly reduced. Fiber lasers with free-running linewidths as narrow as 1 kHz (measured over a fraction of a second), thus two to three orders of magnitude below those of ECDLs, are available today. Evidently, this feature simplifies the feedback electronics (bandwidths as low as 10 kHz are sufficient) and the locking procedure considerably. Moreover, the design and working principle of fiber lasers make them less affected by external disturbances, e.g. mechanical and acoustical noise, than other solid state lasers or ECDLs. In addition, the availability of integrated-optics components, such as fiber based electro-optic modulators (fiber EOMs), offers the possibility to further reduce the complexity of the setup. The first realizations of a NICE-OHMS system based upon a fiber laser and a fiber EOM have recently been demonstrated. It was shown that C_{2}H_{2} could be detected down to 4.5•10^{−12} atm (4.5 ppt) with an instrumentation that is very sturdy. It is clear that this has brought NICE-OHMS a step closer to become a practically useful technique for ultra-sensitive trace species detection!

== See also ==
- Optical heterodyne detection
- Cavity Ring Down Spectroscopy (CRDS)
- Laser absorption spectrometry
- Diode Lasers
- Tunable Diode Laser Absorption Spectroscopy (TDLAS)
- List of laser articles
