= White cell =

White cell may refer to:

- White blood cell
- White cell (spectroscopy), a type of multiple reflection gas phase spectroscopy cell
