= Michell Instruments =

- Company type: Private Limited Company
- Founded: 1974 (as Michell Instruments Ltd.)
- Headquarters: Ely, Cambridgeshire, England
- Key people: Jim Macfarlane, Managing Director
- Products: dew point and relative humidity transmitters, process analyzers, oxygen analyzers, hydrocarbon dew point analyzers
- Website: www.michell.com

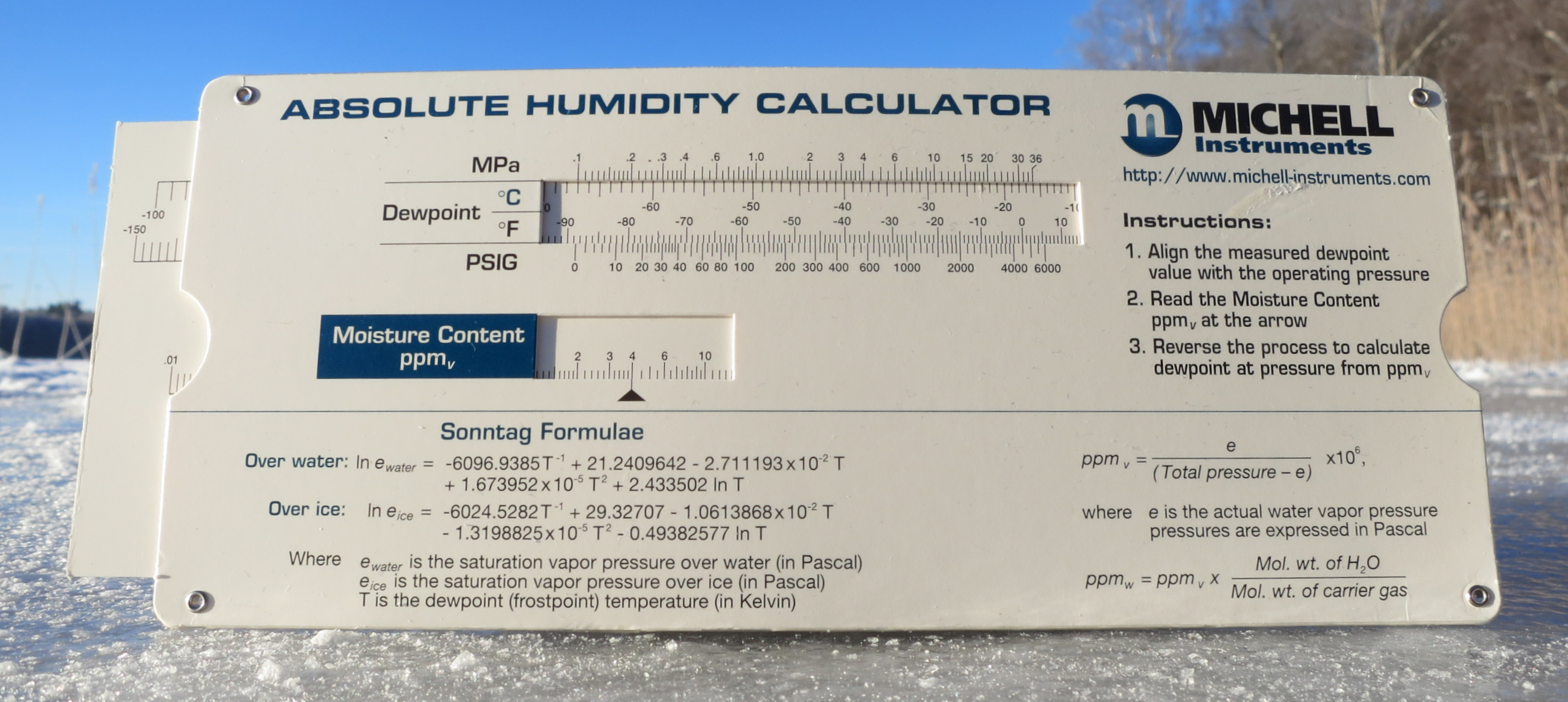
Late 2000s analogue absolute humidity calculator by Michell Instruments

Michell Instruments consists of a group of eight operating companies located in the UK, France, Netherlands, Germany, Italy, US, China and Japan. The group is involved in the design, manufacture and sale of a wide variety of industrial instrumentation including relative humidity, dew point, moisture in gases and liquids and oxygen analysis.

== History ==
The original company, Michell Instruments Ltd, was formed in 1974 in Cambridge, England, by Andrew Michell. In co-operation with scientists at Cambridge University, Michell developed a novel aluminium oxide dew-point sensor based on the thin-film capacitance principle originally proposed by Dr A C Jason et al. at the Torry Research Institute, Aberdeen, UK in the 1950s.

Around 1980 Michell Instruments Ltd. was awarded a contract by the EC Bureau of Reference to develop an international Transfer Standard Dewpoint Hygrometer to provide traceability for European humidity laboratories against the Two Pressure Humidity Generator and Primary Gravimetric Hygrometer operated by the National Bureau of Standards, Washington DC, US (now known as NIST). The project was completed successfully and led to the launch of Michell’s range of chilled mirror dew point meters.

In 1982 the Company moved from its original premises in Covent Garden, Cambridge, to a larger factory in Nuffield Close, Cambridge. In 1984 Michell was selected by the National Physical Laboratory (United Kingdom) to supply a Transfer Standard Dewpoint Hygrometer (model S4000) to its newly built national humidity standard, comprising a Two-Temperature Humidity Generator and a Primary Gravimetric Hygrometer, both built and commissioned by SIRA.

The laboratory accreditation arm of NPL, known at the time as NAMAS and now renamed UKAS (United Kingdom Accreditation Service) launched its humidity laboratory accreditation programme in 1986 and Michell’s Cambridge laboratory was the first to be accredited under the scheme. It remains accredited to date to UKAS, recognised globally through EAL and other institutions, for the calibration of dewpoint sensors, relative humidity sensors and associated temperature measurement devices. In 1989 Michell Ltd achieved BS5750 quality accreditation, which later came under the ISO umbrella as ISO9000 series.

From the mid-1980s Michell Instruments began to develop export sales channels and opened its first overseas sales office in Frankfurt, Germany in 1990. This was followed by the Netherlands (2000), France (2003), China (2004), Italy and Japan (2006), US (2007) and Australasia (2009).

Andrew Michell sold the business in 2005 to a new private holding company owned by John Salmon, founder and former Chairman of Druck Ltd (Leicester, UK). Following the change of ownership the Group developed rapidly with the addition of international sales and service operations and the acquisition of new companies and technologies. Rense Instruments, a Dutch relative humidity company, was acquired in late 2005 and this was followed by the acquisition of the relative humidity operation of Coreci from Italian automation company Gefran spa in 2008. The Michell group has developed quartz crystal microbalance technology for trace moisture measurement in gases, tuneable diode laser absorption spectroscopy (TDLAS) analyzers for moisture in natural gas as well as thermo-paramagnetic and zirconium oxide oxygen sensors and analysers. In 2007 Michell UK re-located from Cambridge to the nearby city of Ely, Cambridgeshire and into a custom-built new factory.

In 2016 the Michell Group was sold to Battery Ventures, a global technology-focused investment firm.

On December 1, 2020, global private-equity firm AEA Investors made a majority investment.
