= Urbach energy =

Energy parameter

The Urbach energy, or Urbach edge, is a parameter typically denoted $E_{0}$, with dimensions of energy, used to quantify energetic disorder in the band edges of a semiconductor. It is evaluated by fitting the absorption coefficient as a function of energy to an exponential function. It is often used to describe electron transport in structurally disordered semiconductors such as hydrogenated amorphous silicon.

== Introduction ==
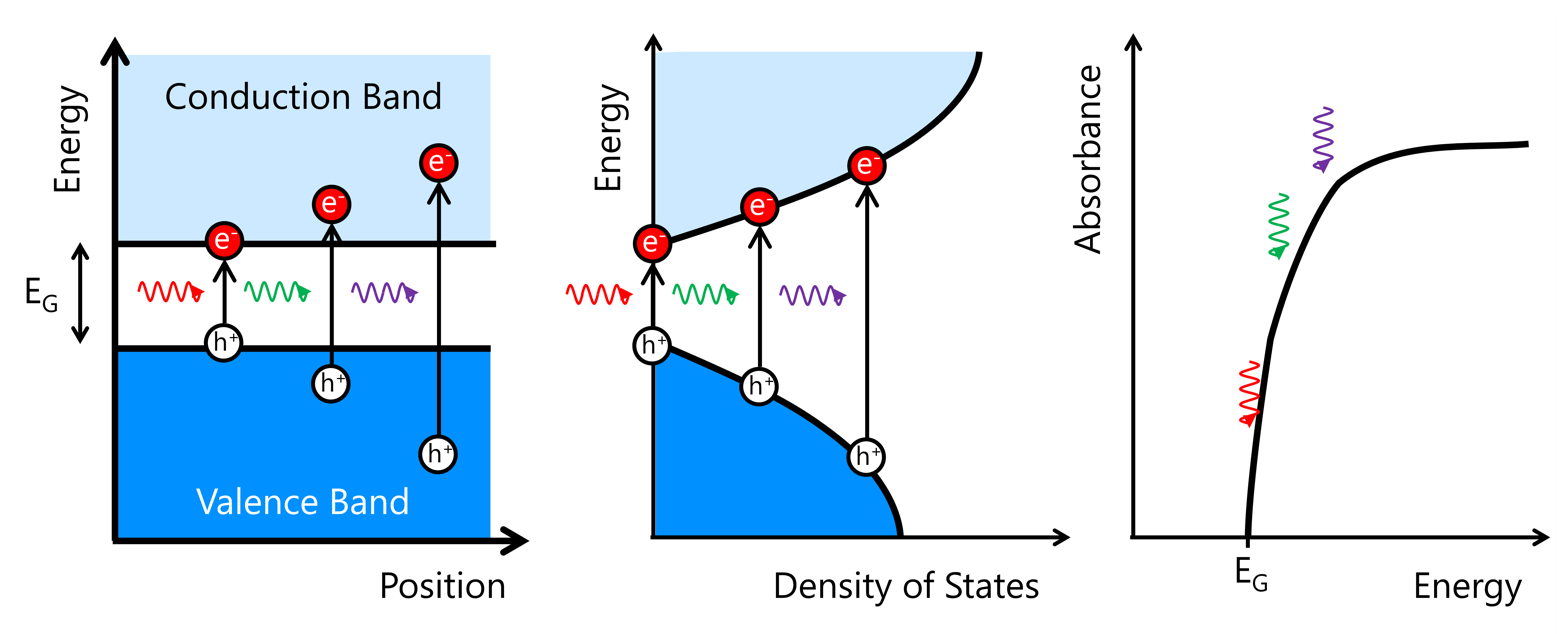
While not apparent in a simple energy-position band diagram (left), the density of states (centre) in both the valance band and the conduction band increases the further from the band gap. This means the absorbance of the semiconductor will increase with energy.

In the simplest description of a semiconductor, a single parameter is used to quantify the onset of optical absorption: the band gap, $E_{G}$. In this description, semiconductors are described as being able to absorb photons above $E_{G}$, but are transparent to photons below $E_{G}$. However, the density of states in 3 dimensional semiconductors increases further from the band gap (this is not generally true in lower dimensional semiconductors however). For this reason, the absorption coefficient, $\alpha$, increases with energy. The Urbach energy quantifies the steepness of the onset of absorption near the band edge, and hence the broadness of the density of states. A sharper onset of absorption represents a lower Urbach energy.

== History and name ==
The Urbach energy is defined by an exponential increase in absorbance with energy. While an exponential dependence of absorbance had been observed previously in photographic materials, it was Franz Urbach that evaluated this property systematically in crystals. He used silver bromide for his study while working at the Kodak Company in 1953.

== Definition ==
Absorption in semiconductors is known to increase exponentially near the onset of absorption, spanning several orders of magnitude. Absorption as a function of energy can be described by the following equation:

$\alpha(E)=\alpha_{0}\exp \biggl(\frac{E-E_{1}}{E_{0}}\biggr)$

where $\alpha_{0}$ and $E_{1}$ are fitting parameters with dimensions of inverse length and energy, respectively, and $E_{0}$ is the Urbach energy. This equation is only valid when $\alpha\propto\exp(E)$. The Urbach energy is temperature-dependent.

Room temperature values of $E_{0}$ for hydrogenated amorphous silicon are typically between 50 meV and 150 meV.

== Relationship to charge transport ==
The Urbach energy is often evaluated to make statements on the energetic disorder of band edges in structurally disordered semiconductors. The Urbach energy has been shown to increase with dangling bond density in hydrogenated amorphous silicon and has been shown to be strongly correlated with the slope of band tails evaluated using transistor measurements. For this reason, it can be used as a proxy for activation energy, $E_{A}$, in semiconductors governed by multiple trapping and release. It is important to state that $E_{0}$ is not the same as $E_{A}$, since $E_{A}$ describes the disorder associated with one band, not both.

== Measurement ==
To evaluate the Urbach energy, the absorption coefficient needs to be measured over several orders of magnitude. For this reason, high precision techniques such as the constant photocurrent method (CPM) or photothermal deflection spectroscopy are used.
