= Pfund telescope =

Type of reflecting telescope

The Pfund telescope, originated by A.H. Pfund, provides an alternative method for achieving a fixed telescope focal point in space regardless of where the telescope line of sight is pointed.

Pfund's configuration uses a two-axis flat feed mirror that reflects starlight into a fixed paraboloidal mirror, usually with a horizontal optical axis.

The paraboloid focuses through a central hole in the feed flat to a convenient location some distance behind the flat. No spider vanes or Newtonian secondary fold mirrors are required in this configuration. This eliminates vane diffraction and blockage, as well as secondary mirror scattering and absorption, thus improving image brightness and contrast.

== Design considerations ==
The feed flat is mounted on a two-axis azimuth/elevation mount. The azimuth and elevation drive servos must be continuously controlled as objects move across the sky, using vector addition to calculate the mirror motion in real time.

- One vector ($\mathbf{V}_1$) is stationary and points from the center of the feed flat to the center of the fixed paraboloid mirror.
- The other vector ($\mathbf{V}_2$) points from the center of the feed flat to the object to be tracked, which of course moves across the sky in time.

The surface normal of the feed flat mirror is the 3D bisector of vectors $\mathbf{V}_1$ and $\mathbf{V}_2$, normalized to unity length. If $[N_k, N_l, N_m]$are the instantaneous unit vector components of the mirror's surface normal, then the mirror elevation angle $\theta_\mathrm{el} = \arcsin(N_l)$, and the mirror azimuth angle is $\arcsin[N_k/\cos(\theta_\mathrm{el})]$.

The field of a Pfund telescope rotates at a nonuniform rate during tracking, precluding it from long-exposure astrophotography, unless a derotation control matrix and optics are used to compensate field rotation.

The hole in the front face of a Pfund tracking flat should only be large enough to pass the desired field of view with minimum vignetting (blocking of part of the light from the paraboloid) to minimize central obstruction. The hole through the flat must be conically shaped, opening outward toward the back of the flat with at least a 45° cone, to prevent vignetting of the image by the back of the steering flat at high mirror tilt angles. (Note: A cylindrical hole would quickly block light passing through the flat from the primary mirror as the steering flat tilt angle increases.)

The front reflective face of the Pfund flat must be polished extremely flat, smooth and zone-free. The flat should ideally be flat to within about 25 nanometers peak-to-valley error. (Note: Departures from flatness, from figure error or deflection, or both, rapidly introduce unacceptable astigmatism in the image.) The front face should lie precisely in the plane of the elevation rotation axis to minimize the required flat mirror aperture. This creates the need for counterweights extending forward from the mirror cell to balance the load on the elevation servo drive.

The diameter of the Pfund flat is generally larger than the focusing paraboloid; its size is a design trade-off between fully illuminated field of view coverage and flat cost and weight. If the Pfund is intended to provide fully illuminated field coverage at a 90° flat angle, then the minimum flat diameter must be at least $\sqrt 2=1.4142$ times the paraboloid diameter.

The aperture stop is the rim of the focusing paraboloid, thus the feed flat has to be slightly larger than the on-axis diameter required to maximize illumination over the desired field.

The McDonald Observatory Supernova Search Telescope used the Pfund configuration, and its feed flat diameter was 24″, while the focusing mirror was an 18″ f/4.5 paraboloid.

== Installations ==
=== U.C. Berkeley: Infrared Spatial Interferometer ===
Examples of Pfund telescopes are the Infrared Spatial Interferometer Array at the University of California at Berkeley. In addition to the array's website, the instrument is described by Townes (1999), and Manly (1999).

=== McDonald Observatory: Supernova Search Telescope ===
The George B. Wren Supernova Search Telescope at McDonald Observatory and the new Wren-Marcario Wheelchair Access Telescope at the McDonald Observatory Visitor Center (to be operational early 2007) are both based on the Pfund configuration. (Note: The Wheelchair Access Telescope is unique in that it will employ two 18″ f/8 mirrors arranged on a north–south line and facing each other, with the steering flat halfway between. The north 18″ mirror covers the northern half-hemisphere of the sky, and the south 18″ mirror covers the south sky, thus providing full sky coverage, which is not possible with a single-mirror Pfund.)

The 24″ steering flat and viewing port assembly rotate in azimuth to either mirror. Each half-hemisphere has its own fixed image location. The Wheelchair Access Telescope is fully compliant with the Americans with Disabilities Act requirements.

=== Fundingsland's home-made telescope ===
John O. Fundingsland was apparently unaware of Pfund's telescope design, and independently developed the same optical configuration. In 1999 he published a description of his 4″ aperture prototype instrument in an amateur astronomy magazine.

== See also ==
- List of telescope types
