= August Herman Pfund =

American physicist

- Born: December 28, 1879; Madison, Wisconsin
- Died: January 4, 1949 (aged 69)
- Education: Johns Hopkins University; University of Wisconsin–Madison
- Known for: Pfund cell Pfund series Pfund sky compass Pfund telescope
- Awards: Edward Longstreth Medal (1922); Frederic Ives Medal (1939)
- Scientific career
- Fields: Physics; Spectroscopy; Calorimetry
- Workplaces: Johns Hopkins University
- Doctoral advisor: Robert W. Wood

August Herman Pfund (December 28, 1879 – January 4, 1949) was an American physicist, spectroscopist, and inventor.

== Early life ==
Pfund was born in Madison, Wisconsin and attended Wisconsin public schools until his entry into the University of Wisconsin–Madison, where he earned a B.S. degree in physics and studied under Robert W. Wood.

== Career ==
Both Wood and Pfund left Wisconsin for Johns Hopkins University in 1903. From 1903 to 1905 Pfund was a Carnegie research assistant and continued to work under Wood. In 1906 Pfund earned his Ph.D. in physics and was a Johnston scholar from 1907 to 1909. He remained at Hopkins for the remainder of his career, eventually becoming a full professor and later chair of the physics department. From 1943 to 1944 Pfund served as the president of the Optical Society of America.

Within the hydrogen spectral series Pfund discovered the fifth series, where an electron jumps up from or drops down to the fifth fundamental level. This Series is known as the "Pfund series". He also invented the Pfund telescope, which is a method for achieving a fixed telescope focal point regardless of where the telescope line of sight is positioned, and the Pfund sky compass, which arose from Pfund's studies of the polarization of scattered light from the sky in 1944, and which greatly helped transpolar flights by allowing the determination of the Sun's direction in twilight. Pfund is also noted for his work into the area of infrared gas analysis.

== See also ==
- Current and past presidents of the Optical Society of America
- Medieval sunstone
