= Laser absorption spectrometry =

Laser absorption spectrometry (LAS) refers to techniques that use lasers to assess the concentration or amount of a species in gas phase by absorption spectrometry (AS).

Optical spectroscopic techniques in general, and laser-based techniques in particular, have a great potential for detection and monitoring of constituents in gas phase. They combine a number of important properties, e.g. a high sensitivity and a high selectivity with non-intrusive and remote sensing capabilities. Laser absorption spectrometry has become the foremost used technique for quantitative assessments of atoms and molecules in gas phase. It is also a widely used technique for a variety of other applications, e.g. within the field of optical frequency metrology or in studies of light-matter interactions. The most common technique is tunable diode laser absorption spectroscopy (TDLAS) which has become commercialized and is used for a variety of applications.

== Direct laser absorption spectrometry ==
The most appealing advantages of LAS is its ability to provide absolute quantitative assessments of species. Its biggest disadvantage is that it relies on a measurement of a small change in power from a high level; any noise introduced by the light source or the transmission through the optical system will deteriorate the sensitivity of the technique. Direct laser absorption spectrometric (DLAS) techniques are therefore often limited to detection of absorbance ~10^{−3}, which is far away from the theoretical shot noise level, which for a single pass DAS technique is in the 10^{−7} – 10^{−8} range. This detection limit is insufficient for many types of applications.

The detection limit can be improved by (1) reducing the noise, (2) using transitions with larger transition strengths or (3) increasing the effective path length. The first can be achieved by the use of a modulation technique, the second can be obtained by using transitions in unconventional wavelength regions, whereas the third by using external cavities.

== Modulated techniques ==
Modulation techniques make use of the fact that technical noise usually decreases with increasing frequency (often referred to as a 1/f noise) and improves on the signal contrast by encoding and detecting the absorption signal at a high frequency, where the noise level is low. The most common modulation techniques, wavelength modulation spectroscopy (WMS) and frequency modulation spectroscopy (FMS), achieve this by rapidly scanning the frequency of the light across the absorbing transition. Both techniques have the advantage that the demodulated signal is low in the absence of absorbers but they are also limited by residual amplitude modulation, either from the laser or from multiple reflections in the optical system (etalon effects). The most frequently used laser-based technique for environmental investigations and process control applications is based upon diode lasers and WMS (typically referred to as TDLAS). The typical sensitivity of WMS and FMS techniques is in the 10^{−5} range.

Due to their good tunability and long lifetime (> 10,000 hours), most practical laser-based absorption spectroscopy is performed today by distributed feedback diode lasers emitting in the 760 nm – 16 μm range. This gives rise to systems that can run unattended for thousands of hours with minimum maintenance.

== Laser absorption spectrometry using fundamental vibrational or electronic transitions ==
The second way of improving the detection limit of LAS is to employ transitions with larger line strength, either in the fundamental vibrational band or electronic transitions. The former, which normally reside at ~5 μm, have line strengths that are ~2–3 orders of magnitude higher than those of typical overtone transition. On the other hand, electronic transitions have often yet another 1–2 orders of magnitude larger line strengths. The transitions strengths for the electronic transitions of NO, which are located in the UV range (at ~227 nm) are ~2 orders of magnitude larger than those in the MIR region.

The recent development of quantum cascade (QC) lasers working in the MIR region has opened up new possibilities for sensitive detection of molecular species on their fundamental vibrational bands. It is more difficult to generate stable cw light addressing electronic transitions, since these often lie in the UV region.

== Cavity enhanced absorption spectrometry ==
The third way of improving the sensitivity of LAS is to increase the path length. This can be obtained by placing the species inside a cavity in which the light bounces back and forth many times, whereby the interaction length can be increased considerably. This has led to a group of techniques denoted as cavity enhanced AS (CEAS). The cavity can either be placed inside the laser, giving rise to intracavity AS, or outside, when it is referred to as an external cavity. Although the former technique can provide a high sensitivity, its practical applicability is limited by non-linear processes.

External cavities can either be of multi-pass type, i.e. Herriott or White cells, or be of resonant type, most often working as a Fabry–Pérot (FP) etalon. Whereas the multi-pass cells typically can provide an enhanced interaction length of up to ~2 orders of magnitude, the resonant cavities can provide a much larger path length enhancement, in the order of the finesse of the cavity, F, which for a balanced cavity with high reflecting mirrors with reflectivities of ~99.99–99.999% can be ~10^{4} to 10^{5}.

A problem with resonant cavities is that a high finesse cavity has narrow cavity modes, often in the low kHz range. Since cw lasers often have free-running line-widths in the MHz range, and pulsed even larger, it is difficult to couple laser light effectively into a high finesse cavity. However, there are a few ways this can be achieved. One such method is Vernier Spectroscopy, which employs a frequency comb laser to excite many cavity modes simultaneously and allows for a highly parallel measurement of trace gases.

=== Cavity ring-down spectroscopy ===
In cavity ring-down spectroscopy (CRDS) the mode-matching condition is circumvented by injecting a short light pulse in the cavity. The absorbance is assessed by comparing the cavity decay times of the pulse as it "leaks out" of the cavity on and off-resonance, respectively. While independent of laser amplitude noise, this technique is often limited by drifts in the system between two consecutive measurements and a low transmission through the cavity. Despite this, sensitivities in the ~10^{−7} range can routinely be obtained (although the most complex setups can reach below this~10^{−9}). CRDS has therefore started to become a standard technique for sensitive trace gas analysis under a variety of conditions. In addition, CRDS is now an effective method for different physical parameters (such as temperature, pressure, strain) sensing.

=== Integrated cavity output spectroscopy ===
Integrated cavity output spectroscopy (ICOS) sometimes called as cavity-enhanced absorption spectroscopy (CEAS) records the integrated intensity behind one of the cavity mirrors, while the laser is repeatedly swept across one or several cavity modes. However, for high finesse cavities the ratio of "on" and "off" a cavity mode is small, given by the inverse of the finesse, whereby the transmission as well as the integrated absorption becomes small. Off-axis ICOS (OA-ICOS) improves on this by coupling the laser light into the cavity from an angle with respect to the main axis so as to not interact with a high density of transverse modes. Although intensity fluctuations are lower than direct on-axis ICOS, the technique is, however, still limited by a low transmission and intensity fluctuations due to partly excitation of high order transverse modes, and can again typically reach sensitivities ~10^{−7} .

=== Continuous wave cavity enhanced absorption spectrometry ===
The group of CEAS techniques that has the largest potential to improve is that based on a continuous coupling of laser light into the cavity. This requires however an active locking of the laser to one of the cavity modes. There are two ways in which this can be done, either by optical or electronic feedback. Optical feedback (OF) locking, originally developed by Romanini et al. for cw-CRDS, uses the optical feedback from the cavity to lock the laser to the cavity while the laser is slowly scanned across the profile (OF-CEAS). In this case, the cavity needs to have a V-shape in order to avoid OF from the incoupling mirror. OF-CEAS is capable of reaching sensitivities ~10^{−8} range, limited by a fluctuating feedback efficiency. Electronic locking is usually realized with the Pound-Drever-Hall (PDH) technique, and is nowadays a well established technique, although it can be difficult to achieve for some types of lasers. It has been shown by that also electronically locked CEAS can be used for sensitive AS on overtone lines.

=== Noise-immune cavity-enhanced optical-heterodyne molecular spectroscopy ===
However, all attempts to directly combine CEAS with a locking approach (DCEAS) have one thing in common; they do not manage to use the full power of the cavity, i.e. to reach limits of detection (LODs) close to the (multi-pass) shot-noise level, which is roughly 2F/π times below that of DAS and can be down to ~10^{−13}. The reason is twofold: (i) any remaining frequency noise of the laser relative to the cavity mode will, due to the narrow cavity mode, be directly converted to amplitude noise in the transmitted light, thereby impairing the sensitivity; and (ii) none of these techniques makes use of any modulation technique, wherefore they still suffer from the 1/f noise in the system. There is, however, one technique that so far has succeeded in making full use of the cavity by combining locked CEAS with FMS so as to circumvent both of these problems: Noise-immune cavity-enhanced optical heterodyne molecular spectroscopy (NICE-OHMS). The first and so far ultimate realization of this technique, performed for frequency standard applications, reached an astonishing LODs of 5•10^{−13} (1•10^{−14} cm^{−1}). It is clear that this technique, correctly developed, has a larger potential than any other technique for trace gas analysis.

== Quartz-Enhanced Photoacoustic Spectroscopy ==
Quartz-Enhanced Photoacoustic Spectroscopy (QEPAS) is a high-sensitivity and selective optical sensing technique used for trace gas quantification and environmental monitoring.

Instead of a traditional microphone, QEPAS uses a quartz tuning fork (QTF)—similar to the ones found in electronic watches—as a high-Q acoustic transducer.A laser beam tuned to a specific absorption line of a target gas passes through a gas sample. When the laser intensity is modulated, the gas molecules absorb the light and release thermal energy via non-radiative relaxation, creating periodic acoustic pressure waves.The acoustic pressure waves force the prongs of the QTF to vibrate. Because quartz is piezoelectric, this mechanical deflection converts directly into an electrical voltage or current signal.

A quartz tuning fork with a high Q-factor functions as a narrow-band filter, making it possible to eliminate noise.
