= Absorption spectroscopy =

Spectroscopic techniques that measure the absorption of radiation

An overview of electromagnetic radiation absorption. This example discusses the general principle using visible light. A white beam source – emitting light of multiple wavelengths – is focused on a sample (the complementary color pairs are indicated by the yellow dotted lines). Upon striking the sample, photons that match the energy gap of the molecules present (green light in this example) are absorbed in order to excite the molecule. Other photons transmit unaffected and, if the radiation is in the visible region (400–700 nm), the sample color is the complementary color of the absorbed light. By comparing the attenuation of the transmitted light with the incident, an absorption spectrum can be obtained.

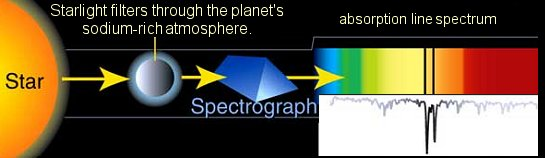
The first direct detection and chemical analysis of the atmosphere of an exoplanet, in 2001. Sodium in the atmosphere filters the starlight of HD 209458 as the giant planet passes in front of the star.

Absorption spectroscopy is spectroscopy that involves techniques that measure the absorption of electromagnetic radiation, as a function of frequency or wavelength, due to its interaction with a sample. The sample absorbs energy, i.e., photons, from the radiating field. The intensity of the absorption varies as a function of frequency, and this variation is the absorption spectrum. Absorption spectroscopy is performed across the electromagnetic spectrum.

Absorption spectroscopy is employed as an analytical chemistry tool to determine the presence of a particular substance in a sample and, in many cases, to quantify the amount of the substance present. Infrared and ultraviolet–visible spectroscopy are particularly common in analytical applications. Absorption spectroscopy is also employed in studies of molecular and atomic physics, astronomical spectroscopy and remote sensing.

There is a wide range of experimental approaches for measuring absorption spectra. The most common arrangement is to direct a generated beam of radiation at a sample and detect the intensity of the radiation that passes through it. The transmitted energy can be used to calculate the absorption. The source, sample arrangement and detection technique vary significantly depending on the frequency range and the purpose of the experiment.

Following are the major types of absorption spectroscopy:

Sr. No	Electromagnetic radiation	Spectroscopic type
1	X-ray	X-ray absorption spectroscopy
2	Ultraviolet–visible	UV–vis absorption spectroscopy
3	Infrared	IR absorption spectroscopy
4	Microwave	Microwave absorption spectroscopy
5	Radio wave	Electron spin resonance spectroscopy Nuclear magnetic resonance spectroscopy

== Absorption spectrum ==
Solar spectrum with Fraunhofer lines as it appears visually

A material's absorption spectrum is the fraction of incident radiation absorbed by the material over a range of frequencies of electromagnetic radiation. The absorption spectrum is primarily determined by the atomic and molecular composition of the material. Radiation is more likely to be absorbed at frequencies that match the energy difference between two quantum mechanical states of the molecules. The absorption that occurs due to a transition between two states is referred to as an absorption line and a spectrum is typically composed of many lines.

The frequencies at which absorption lines occur, as well as their relative intensities, primarily depend on the electronic and molecular structure of the sample. The frequencies will also depend on the interactions between molecules in the sample, the crystal structure in solids, and on several environmental factors (e.g., temperature, pressure, electric field, magnetic field). The lines will also have a width and shape that are primarily determined by the spectral density or the density of states of the system.

=== Theory ===
Absorption lines are typically classified by the nature of the quantum mechanical change induced in the molecule or atom. Rotational lines, for instance, occur when the rotational state of a molecule is changed. Rotational lines are typically found in the microwave spectral region. Vibrational lines correspond to changes in the vibrational state of the molecule and are typically found in the infrared region. Electronic lines correspond to a change in the electronic state of an atom or molecule and are typically found in the visible and ultraviolet region. X-ray absorptions are associated with the excitation of inner shell electrons in atoms. These changes can also be combined (e.g. rotation–vibration transitions), leading to new absorption lines at the combined energy of the two changes.

The energy associated with the quantum mechanical change primarily determines the frequency of the absorption line but the frequency can be shifted by several types of interactions. Electric and magnetic fields can cause a shift. Interactions with neighboring molecules can cause shifts. For instance, absorption lines of the gas phase molecule can shift significantly when that molecule is in a liquid or solid phase and interacting more strongly with neighboring molecules.

The width and shape of absorption lines are determined by the instrument used for the observation, the material absorbing the radiation and the physical environment of that material. It is common for lines to have the shape of a Gaussian or Lorentzian distribution. It is also common for a line to be described solely by its intensity and width instead of the entire shape being characterized.

The integrated intensity—obtained by integrating the area under the absorption line—is proportional to the amount of the absorbing substance present. The intensity is also related to the temperature of the substance and the quantum mechanical interaction between the radiation and the absorber. This interaction is quantified by the transition moment and depends on the particular lower state the transition starts from, and the upper state it is connected to.

The width of absorption lines may be determined by the spectrometer used to record it. A spectrometer has an inherent limit on how narrow a line it can resolve and so the observed width may be at this limit. If the width is larger than the resolution limit, then it is primarily determined by the environment of the absorber. A liquid or solid absorber, in which neighboring molecules strongly interact with one another, tends to have broader absorption lines than a gas. Increasing the temperature or pressure of the absorbing material will also tend to increase the line width. It is also common for several neighboring transitions to be close enough to one another that their lines overlap and the resulting overall line is therefore broader yet.

=== Relation to transmission spectrum ===
Absorption and transmission spectra represent equivalent information and one can be calculated from the other through a mathematical transformation. A transmission spectrum will have its maximum intensities at wavelengths where the absorption is weakest because more light is transmitted through the sample. An absorption spectrum will have its maximum intensities at wavelengths where the absorption is strongest.

=== Relation to emission spectrum ===
The emission spectrum of iron

Emission is a process by which a substance releases energy in the form of electromagnetic radiation. Emission can occur at any frequency at which absorption can occur, and this allows the absorption lines to be determined from an emission spectrum. The emission spectrum will typically have a quite different intensity pattern from the absorption spectrum, though, so the two are not equivalent. The absorption spectrum can be calculated from the emission spectrum using Einstein coefficients.

=== Relation to scattering and reflection spectra ===
The scattering and reflection spectra of a material are influenced by both its refractive index and its absorption spectrum. In an optical context, the absorption spectrum is typically quantified by the extinction coefficient, and the extinction and index coefficients are quantitatively related through the Kramers–Kronig relations. Therefore, the absorption spectrum can be derived from a scattering or reflection spectrum. This typically requires simplifying assumptions or models, and so the derived absorption spectrum is an approximation.

== Applications ==
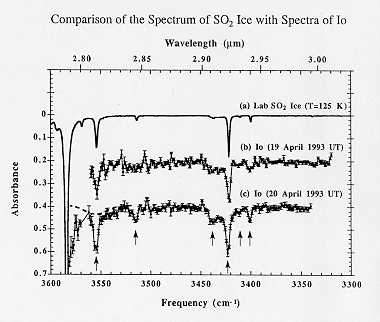
The infrared absorption spectrum of NASA laboratory sulfur dioxide ice is compared with the infrared absorption spectra of ices on Jupiter's moon, Io credit NASA, Bernard Schmitt, and UKIRT.

Absorption spectroscopy is useful in chemical analysis because of its specificity and its quantitative nature. The specificity of absorption spectra allows compounds to be distinguished from one another in a mixture, making absorption spectroscopy useful in wide variety of applications. For instance, Infrared gas analyzers can be used to detect pollutants in the air, distinguishing them from nitrogen, oxygen, water, and other expected constituents.

The specificity also allows unknown samples to be identified by comparing a measured spectrum with a library of reference spectra. In many cases, qualitative information about a sample can be determined even if it is not in a library. Infrared spectra, for instance, have characteristic absorption bands that indicate if carbon-hydrogen or carbon-oxygen bonds are present.

An absorption spectrum can be quantitatively related to the amount of material present using the Beer–Lambert law . Determining the absolute concentration of a compound requires knowledge of the compound's absorption coefficient. The absorption coefficient for some compounds is available in reference sources, and it can also be determined by measuring the spectrum of a calibration standard with a known concentration of the target compound.

=== Remote sensing ===
One of the unique advantages of spectroscopy as an analytical technique is that measurements can be made without bringing the instrument and sample into contact. Radiation that travels between a sample and an instrument will contain the spectral information, so the measurement can be made remotely. Remote spectral sensing is valuable in many situations. For example, measurements can be made in toxic or hazardous environments without placing an operator or instrument at risk. Also, sample material does not have to be brought into contact with the instrument—preventing possible cross contamination.

Remote spectral measurements present several challenges compared to laboratory measurements. The space in between the sample of interest and the instrument may also have spectral absorptions. These absorptions can mask or confound the absorption spectrum of the sample. These background interferences may also vary over time. The source of radiation in remote measurements is often an environmental source, such as sunlight or the thermal radiation from a warm object, and this makes it necessary to distinguish spectral absorption from changes in the source spectrum.

To simplify these challenges, differential optical absorption spectroscopy has gained some popularity, as it focusses on differential absorption features and omits broad-band absorption such as aerosol extinction and extinction due to rayleigh scattering. This method is applied to ground-based, airborne, and satellite-based measurements. Some ground-based methods provide the possibility to retrieve tropospheric and stratospheric trace gas profiles.

=== Astronomy ===
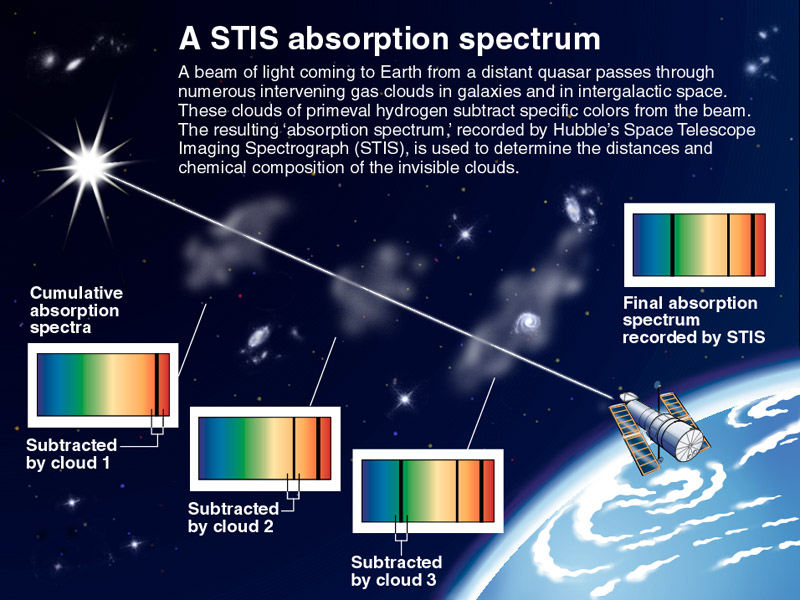
Absorption spectrum observed by the Hubble Space Telescope

Astronomical spectroscopy is a particularly significant type of remote spectral sensing. In this case, the objects and samples of interest are so distant from earth that electromagnetic radiation is the only means available to measure them. Astronomical spectra contain both absorption and emission spectral information. Absorption spectroscopy has been particularly important for understanding interstellar clouds and determining that some of them contain molecules. Absorption spectroscopy is also employed in the study of extrasolar planets. Detection of extrasolar planets by transit photometry also measures their absorption spectrum and allows for the determination of the planet's atmospheric composition, temperature, pressure, and scale height, and hence allows also for the determination of the planet's mass.

=== Atomic and molecular physics ===
Theoretical models, principally quantum mechanical models, allow for the absorption spectra of atoms and molecules to be related to other physical properties such as electronic structure, atomic or molecular mass, and molecular geometry. Therefore, measurements of the absorption spectrum are used to determine these other properties. Microwave spectroscopy, for example, allows for the determination of bond lengths and angles with high precision.

In addition, spectral measurements can be used to determine the accuracy of theoretical predictions. For example, the Lamb shift measured in the hydrogen atomic absorption spectrum was not expected to exist at the time it was measured. Its discovery spurred and guided the development of quantum electrodynamics, and measurements of the Lamb shift are now used to determine the fine-structure constant.

== Experimental methods ==
=== Basic approach ===
The most straightforward approach to absorption spectroscopy is to generate radiation with a source, measure a reference spectrum of that radiation with a detector and then re-measure the sample spectrum after placing the material of interest in between the source and detector. The two measured spectra can then be combined to determine the material's absorption spectrum. The sample spectrum alone is not sufficient to determine the absorption spectrum because it will be affected by the experimental conditions—the spectrum of the source, the absorption spectra of other materials between the source and detector, and the wavelength dependent characteristics of the detector. The reference spectrum will be affected in the same way, though, by these experimental conditions and therefore the combination yields the absorption spectrum of the material alone.

A wide variety of radiation sources are employed in order to cover the electromagnetic spectrum. For spectroscopy, it is generally desirable for a source to cover a broad swath of wavelengths in order to measure a broad region of the absorption spectrum. Some sources inherently emit a broad spectrum. Examples of these include globars or other black body sources in the infrared, mercury lamps in the visible and ultraviolet, and X-ray tubes. One recently developed, novel source of broad spectrum radiation is synchrotron radiation, which covers all of these spectral regions. Other radiation sources generate a narrow spectrum, but the emission wavelength can be tuned to cover a spectral range. Examples of these include klystrons in the microwave region and lasers across the infrared, visible, and ultraviolet region (though not all lasers have tunable wavelengths).

The detector employed to measure the radiation power will also depend on the wavelength range of interest. Most detectors are sensitive to a fairly broad spectral range and the sensor selected will often depend more on the sensitivity and noise requirements of a given measurement. Examples of detectors common in spectroscopy include heterodyne receivers in the microwave, bolometers in the millimeter-wave and infrared, mercury cadmium telluride and other cooled semiconductor detectors in the infrared, and photodiodes and photomultiplier tubes in the visible and ultraviolet.

If both the source and the detector cover a broad spectral region, then it is also necessary to introduce a means of resolving the wavelength of the radiation in order to determine the spectrum. Often a spectrograph is used to spatially separate the wavelengths of radiation so that the power at each wavelength can be measured independently. It is also common to employ interferometry to determine the spectrum—Fourier transform infrared spectroscopy is a widely used implementation of this technique.

Two other issues that must be considered in setting up an absorption spectroscopy experiment include the optics used to direct the radiation and the means of holding or containing the sample material (called a cuvette or cell). For most UV, visible, and NIR measurements the use of precision quartz cuvettes are necessary. In both cases, it is important to select materials that have relatively little absorption of their own in the wavelength range of interest. The absorption of other materials could interfere with or mask the absorption from the sample. For instance, in several wavelength ranges it is necessary to measure the sample under vacuum or in a noble gas environment because gases in the atmosphere have interfering absorption features.

=== Specific approaches ===
- Astronomical spectroscopy
- Cavity ring-down spectroscopy (CRDS)
- Laser absorption spectrometry (LAS)
- Mössbauer spectroscopy
- Photoacoustic spectroscopy
- Photoemission spectroscopy
- Photothermal optical microscopy
- Photothermal spectroscopy
- Reflectance spectroscopy
- Reflection-absorption infrared spectroscopy (RAIRS)
- Total absorption spectroscopy (TAS)
- Tunable diode laser absorption spectroscopy (TDLAS)
- X-ray absorption fine structure (XAFS)
- X-ray absorption near edge structure (XANES)

== See also ==
- Absorption (optics)
- Densitometry
- HITRAN
- Infrared gas analyzer
- Infrared spectroscopy of metal carbonyls
- Lyman-alpha forest
- Optical density
- Photoemission spectroscopy
- Transparent materials
- Water absorption
- White cell (spectroscopy)
- X-ray absorption spectroscopy
