= Photothermal spectroscopy =

Photothermal spectroscopy is a group of high sensitivity spectroscopy techniques used to measure optical absorption and thermal characteristics of a sample. The basis of photothermal spectroscopy is the change in thermal state of the sample resulting from the absorption of radiation. Light absorbed and not lost by emission results in heating. The heat raises temperature thereby influencing the thermodynamic properties of the sample or of a suitable material adjacent to it. Measurement of the temperature, pressure, or density changes that occur due to optical absorption are ultimately the basis for the photothermal spectroscopic measurements.

As with photoacoustic spectroscopy, photothermal spectroscopy is an indirect method for measuring optical absorption, because it is not based on the direct measure of the light which is involved in the absorption. In another sense, however, photothermal (and photoacoustic) methods measure directly the absorption, rather than e.g. calculate it from the transmission, as is the case of more usual (transmission) spectroscopic techniques. And it is this fact that gives the technique its high sensitivity, because in transmission techniques the absorbance is calculated as the difference between total light impinging on the sample and the transmitted (plus reflected, plus scattered) light, with the usual problems of accuracy when one deals with small differences between large numbers, if the absorption is small. In photothermal spectroscopies, instead, the signal is essentially proportional to the absorption, and is zero when there is zero true absorption, even in the presence of reflection or scattering.

There are several methods and techniques used in photothermal spectroscopy. Each of these has a name indicating the specific physical effect measured.

- Photothermal lens spectroscopy (PTS or TLS) measures the thermal blooming that occurs when a beam of light heats a transparent sample. It is typically applied for measuring minute quantities of substances in homogeneous gas and liquid solutions.
- Photothermal deflection spectroscopy (PDS), also called the mirage effect, measures the bending of light due to optical absorption. This technique is particularly useful for measuring surface absorption and for profiling thermal properties in layered materials.
- Photothermal diffraction, a type of four wave mixing, monitors the effect of transient diffraction gratings "written" into the sample with coherent lasers. It is a form of real-time holography.
- Photothermal emission measures an increase in sample infrared radiance occurring as a consequence of absorption. Sample emission follows Stefan's law of thermal emission. This methods is used to measure the thermal properties of solids and layered materials.
- Photothermal single particle microscopy. This technique allows the detection of single absorbing nanoparticles via the creation of a spherically symmetric thermal lens for imaging and correlation spectroscopy.

== Photothermal deflection spectroscopy ==
Photothermal deflection spectroscopy is a kind of spectroscopy that measures the change in refractive index due to heating of a medium by light. It works via a sort of "mirage effect" where a refractive index gradient exists adjacent to the test sample surface. A probe laser beam is refracted or bent in a manner proportional to the temperature gradient of the transparent medium near the surface. From this deflection, a measure of the absorbed excitation radiation can be determined. The technique is useful when studying optically thin samples, because sensitive measurements can be obtained of whether absorption is occurring. It is of value in situations where "pass through" or transmission spectroscopy can't be used.

There are two main forms of PDS: Collinear and Transverse. Collinear PDS was introduced in a 1980 paper by A.C. Boccara, D. Fournier, et al. In collinear, two beams pass through and intersect in a medium. The pump beam heats the material and the probe beam is deflected. This technique only works for transparent media. In transverse, the pump beam heats come in normal to the surface, and the probe beam passes parallel. In a variation on this, the probe beam may reflect off the surface, and measure buckling due to heating. Transverse PDS can be done in Nitrogen, but better performance is gained in a liquid cell: usually an inert, non-absorbing material such as a perfluorocarbon is used.

In both collinear and transverse PDS, the surface is heated using a periodically modulated light source, such as an optical beam passing through a mechanical chopper or regulated with a function generator. A lock-in amplifier is then used to measure deflections found at the modulation frequency. Another scheme uses a pulsed laser as the excitation source. In that case, a boxcar average can be used to measure the temporal deflection of the probe beam to the excitation radiation. The signal falls off exponentially as a function of frequency, so frequencies around 1-10 hertz are frequently used. A full theoretical analysis of the PDS system was published by Jackson, Amer, et al. in 1981. The same paper also discussed the use of PDS as a form of microscopy, called "Photothermal Deflection Microscopy", which can yield information about impurities and the surface topology of materials.

PDS analysis of thin films can also be performed using a patterned substrate that supports optical resonances, such as guided-mode resonance and whispering-gallery modes. The probe beam is coupled into a resonant mode and the coupling efficiency is highly sensitive to the incidence angle. Due to the photoheating effect, the coupling efficiency is changed and characterized to indicate the thin film absorption.

== Quartz-tuning-fork enhanced photothermal spectroscopy ==
Quartz-tuning-fork enhanced photothermal spectroscopy (QEPTS) is a state-of-the-art, ultra-sensitive optical gas-sensing technique that employs a miniature quartz tuning fork—which possesses piezoelectric properties—as a thermal detector to measure trace gases with extremely high sensitivity.In this technique, the modulation frequency of a laser is matched to the natural resonant frequency of the quartz tuning fork (typically around 32.768 kHz, the frequency used in inexpensive timekeeping crystals). The resulting localized thermal cycles—along with the associated minute changes in refractive index and volume—induce physical resonance and vibration in the tines of the tuning fork. Because quartz is a piezoelectric material, this vibration generates an electrical charge on the electrodes, producing a voltage signal (a photothermal signal) that is proportional to the gas concentration.A quartz tuning fork with a high Q-factor functions as a narrow-band filter, making it possible to eliminate noise. The QTF's symmetric quadrupole mode responds almost exclusively to sound generated directly between its prongs, filtering out background noise.

Unlike direct absorption spectroscopy (TDLAS) or classical photothermal setups, the Quartz-tuning-fork(QTF) itself replaces expensive and wavelength-limited photodetectors.

Recent research has led to the development of highly compact systems that integrate a quartz tuning fork with specialized optical fiber cells, such as anti-resonant hollow-core fibers (ARHCFs). These systems enable high-precision measurements of gas samples in extremely small volumes—down to the microliter range or less.

== See also ==
- Photothermal effect
- Photothermal microspectroscopy
- Photothermal optical microscopy
- Urbach energy
