= Cavity ring-down spectroscopy =

Optical spectroscopic technique

Cavity ring-down spectroscopy (CRDS) is a highly sensitive optical spectroscopic technique that enables measurement of absolute optical extinction by samples that scatter and absorb light. It has been widely used to study gaseous samples which absorb light at specific wavelengths, and in turn to determine mole fractions down to the parts per trillion level. The technique is also known as cavity ring-down laser absorption spectroscopy (CRLAS).

A typical CRDS setup consists of a laser that is used to illuminate a high-finesse optical cavity, which in its simplest form consists of two highly reflective mirrors. When the laser is in resonance with a cavity mode, intensity builds up in the cavity due to constructive interference. The laser is then turned off in order to allow the measurement of the exponentially decaying light intensity leaking from the cavity. During this decay, light is reflected back and forth thousands of times between the mirrors giving an effective path length for the extinction on the order of a few kilometers. CRDS is traditionally conducted with monochromatic laser sources resulting in restricted spectral coverage. Recent efforts have demonstrated the use of broadband laser frequency comb sources for significantly broader spectral coverage.

If a light-absorbing material is now placed in the cavity, the mean lifetime decreases as fewer bounces through the medium are required before the light is fully absorbed, or absorbed to some fraction of its initial intensity. A CRDS setup measures how long it takes for the light to decay to 1/e of its initial intensity, and this "ringdown time" can be used to calculate the concentration of the absorbing substance in the gas mixture in the cavity.

== Detailed description ==
Cavity ring-down spectroscopy is a form of laser absorption spectroscopy. In CRDS, a laser pulse is trapped in a highly reflective (typically $R>99\%$) detection cavity. The intensity of the trapped pulse will decrease by a fixed percentage during each round trip within the cell due to absorption, scattering by the medium within the cell, and reflectivity losses. The intensity of light within the cavity is then determined as an exponential function of time.

$$I(t) = I_0 \exp \left (- t / \tau \right)$$

The principle of operation is based on the measurement of a decay rate rather than an absolute absorbance. This is one reason for the increased sensitivity over traditional absorption spectroscopy, as the technique is then immune to shot-to-shot laser fluctuations. The decay constant, $\tau$, which is the time taken for the intensity of light to fall to $1/e$ of the initial intensity, is called the ring-down time and is dependent on the loss mechanism(s) within the cavity. For an empty cavity, the decay constant is dependent on mirror loss and various optical phenomena like scattering and refraction:

$$\tau_0 = \frac{n}{c} \cdot \frac{l}{1-R+X}$$

where $n$ is the index of refraction within the cavity, $c$ is the speed of light in vacuum, $l$ is the cavity length, $R$ is the mirror reflectivity, and $X$ takes into account other miscellaneous optical losses. This equation uses the approximation that $\ln(1+x)\approx x$ for $x$ close to zero, which is the case under cavity ring-down conditions. Often, the miscellaneous losses are factored into an effective mirror loss for simplicity. An absorbing species in the cavity will increase losses according to the Beer-Lambert law. Assuming the sample fills the entire cavity,

$$\tau = \frac{n}{c} \cdot \frac{l}{1-R+X+ \alpha l }$$

where $\alpha$ is the absorption coefficient for a specific analyte concentration at the cavity's resonance wavelength. The decadic absorbance, $A$, due to the analyte can be determined from both ring-down times.

$$A = \frac{n}{c} \cdot \frac{l}{2.303} \cdot \left ( \frac{1}{\tau} - \frac{1}{\tau_0} \right)$$

Alternatively, the molar absorptivity, $\epsilon$, and analyte concentration, $C$, can be determined from the ratio of both ring-down times. If $X$ can be neglected, one obtains

$$\frac{\tau_0}{\tau} =1+ \frac{ \alpha l }{1-R} = 1+\frac{2.303 \epsilon l C}{(1-R)}$$

When a ratio of species' concentrations is the analytical objective, as for example in carbon-13 to carbon-12 measurements in carbon dioxide, the ratio of ring-down times measured for the same sample at the relevant absorption frequencies can be used directly with extreme accuracy and precision.

== Advantages of CRDS ==
There are two main advantages to CRDS over other absorption methods:

First, it is not affected by fluctuations in the laser intensity. In most absorption measurements, the light source must be assumed to remain steady between blank (no analyte), standard (known amount of analyte), and sample (unknown amount of analyte). Any drift (change in the light source) between measurements will introduce errors. In CRDS, the ringdown time does not depend on the intensity of the laser, so fluctuations of this type are not a problem. Independency from laser intensity makes CRDS needless to any calibration and comparison with standards.

Second, it is very sensitive due to its long pathlength. In absorption measurements, the smallest amount that can be detected is proportional to the length that the light travels through a sample. Since the light reflects many times between the mirrors, it ends up traveling long distances. For example, a laser pulse making 500 round trips through a 1-meter cavity will effectively have traveled through 1 kilometer of sample.

Thus, the advantages include:

- High sensitivity due to the multipass nature (i.e. long pathlength) of the detection cell.
- Immunity to shot variations in laser intensity due to the measurement of a rate constant.
- Wide range of use for a given set of mirrors; typically, ±5% of the center wavelength.
- High throughput, individual ring down events occur on the millisecond time scale.
- No need for a fluorophore, which makes it more attractive than laser-induced fluorescence (LIF) or resonance-enhanced multiphoton ionization (REMPI) for some (e.g. rapidly predissociating) systems.
- Commercial systems available.

== Disadvantages of CRDS ==
- Spectra cannot be acquired quickly if monochromatic laser source is used. To resolve this issue, latest research has demonstrated the use of broadband frequency comb source for significantly larger spectral coverage.
- Analytes are limited both by the availability of tunable laser light at the appropriate wavelength and also the availability of high reflectance mirrors at those wavelengths.
- Expense: the requirement for laser systems and high reflectivity mirrors often makes CRDS orders of magnitude more expensive than some alternative spectroscopic techniques.
- Dynamic range is limited. As the absorber concentration increases, the ring-down time decreases, thus detectors must be fast enough to record sufficient data points for a desired uncertainty.

== Applications ==
=== Greenhouse Gas Measurement ===
CRDS is widely used for high-precision measurement of greenhouse gases such as carbon dioxide (CO_{2}), methane (CH_{4}), and nitrous oxide (N_{2}O). By measuring absorption over an optical cavity with extremely high effective path lengths, CRDS can achieve sensitivities in the parts-per-billion (ppb) to parts-per-trillion (ppt) range.

Portable and field-deployable CRDS analyzers are now used in global atmospheric monitoring networks (e.g., NOAA, ICOS) for studying carbon fluxes, ocean–atmosphere CO_{2} exchange, and long-term climate trends.

Because of its high sensitivity and long-term stability, CRDS has become a preferred method for calibration-free greenhouse gas monitoring and isotope ratio measurements (e.g., δ^{13}C in CO_{2}, δD in CH_{4}).

=== Air Quality Analysis ===
CRDS instruments are used in environmental and industrial settings to quantify trace gases such as ammonia (NH_{3}), nitrogen oxides (NO and NO_{2}), sulfur dioxide (SO_{2}), and hydrogen sulfide (H_{2}S). These compounds are key indicators of air pollution and industrial emissions.

The high time resolution and low detection limits of CRDS make it valuable for monitoring fast-changing processes like combustion chemistry, atmospheric reactions, or livestock emissions.

For example, CRDS-based NH_{3} analyzers are commonly deployed near agricultural sites to quantify ammonia volatilization, while NO_{2} and SO_{2} measurements are used to track vehicular and power plant emissions.

=== Explosives Detection ===
Thermal dissociation cavity ring-down spectroscopy (TD-CRDS) has emerged as an important method for detecting trace levels of explosive vapors and residues. In this technique, thermally decomposed explosive compounds are converted into characteristic gas-phase species such as NO_{2}, which are then quantified using CRDS.

The method offers parts-per-trillion sensitivity and molecular selectivity, making it effective for detecting nitrate-containing explosives, including nitroaromatic (e.g., TNT), nitramine (e.g., RDX, HMX), and nitrate ester (e.g., PETN) compounds.

Because CRDS is an optical method, it is also well-suited to remote or standoff detection, potentially useful in security screening and forensic applications.

== See also ==
- Absorption spectroscopy
- Laser absorption spectrometry
- Noise-Immune Cavity-Enhanced Optical-Heterodyne Molecular Spectroscopy (NICE-OHMS)
- Tunable Diode Laser Absorption Spectroscopy (TDLAS)
