= Gas in scattering media absorption spectroscopy =

Gas in scattering media absorption spectroscopy (GASMAS) is an optical technique for sensing and analysis of gas located within porous and highly scattering solids, e.g. powders, ceramics, wood, fruit, translucent packages, pharmaceutical tablets, foams, human paranasal sinuses etc. It was introduced in 2001 by Prof. Sune Svanberg and co-workers at Lund University (Sweden). The technique is related to conventional high-resolution laser spectroscopy for sensing and spectroscopy of gas (e.g. tunable diode laser absorption spectroscopy, TDLAS), but the fact that the gas here is "hidden" inside solid materials give rise to important differences.

== Basic Principles ==
Free gases exhibit very sharp spectral features, and different gas species have their own unique spectral fingerprints. At atmospheric pressure, absorption linewidths are typically on the order of 0.1 cm^{−1} (i.e. ~3 GHz in optical frequency or 0.006 nm in wavelength), while solid media have dull spectral behavior with absorption features thousand times wider. By looking for the sharp absorption imprints in light emerging from porous samples, it is thus possible to detect gases confined in solids – even though the solid often attenuates light much stronger than the gas itself.

The basic principle of GASMAS is shown in figure 1. Laser light is sent into a sample with gas cavities, which could either be small pores (left) or larger gas-filled chambers. The heterogeneous nature of the porous material often give rise to strong light scattering, and pathlengths are often surprisingly long (10 or 100 times the sample dimension are not uncommon). In addition, light will experience absorption related to the solid material. When travelling through the material, light will travel partly through the pores, and will thus experience the spectrally sharp gas absorption. Light leaving the material will carry this information, and can be collected by a detector either in a transmission mode (left) or in a reflection mode (right).

In order to detect the spectrally sharp fingerprints related to the gas, GASMAS has so far relied on high-resolution tunable diode laser absorption spectroscopy (TDLAS). In principle, this means that a nearly monochromatic (narrow-bandwidth) laser is scanned across an absorption line of the gas, and a detector records the transmission profile. In order to increase sensitivity, modulation techniques are often employed.

The strength of the gas absorption will depend, as given by the Beer-Lambert law, both on the gas concentration and the path-length that the light has travelled through the gas. In conventional TDLAS, the path-length is known and the concentration is readily calculated from the transmittance. In GASMAS, extensive scattering renders the pathlength unknown and the determination of gas concentration is aggravated. In many applications, however, the gas concentration is known and other parameters are in focus. Furthermore, as discussed in 2.2, there are complementing techniques that can provide information on the optical pathlength, thus allowing evaluation also of gas concentrations.

== Challenges ==
=== Optical interference noise ===
It is well known that optical interference often is a major problem in laser-based gas spectroscopy. In conventional laser-based gas spectrometers, the optical interference originates from e.g. etalon-type interference effects in (or between) optical components and multi-pass gas cells. Throughout the years, great efforts have been devoted to handle this problem. Proper optical design is important to minimize interference from the beginning (e.g. by tilting optical components, avoiding transmissive optics and using anti-reflection coating), but interference patterns can not be completely avoided and are often difficult to separate from gas absorption. Since gas spectroscopy often involves measurement of small absorption fractions (down to 10^{−7}), appropriate handling of interference is crucial. Utilised countermeasures include customized optical design, tailored laser modulation, mechanical dithering, signal post-processing, sample modulation, and baseline recording and interference subtraction.

In the case of GASMAS, optical interference is particularly cumbersome. This is related to the severe speckle-type interference that originates from the interaction between laser light and highly scattering solid materials. Since this highly non-uniform interference is generated in same place as the utility signal, it cannot be removed by design. The optical properties of the porous material under study determines the interference pattern, and the level of interference is not seldom much stronger than actual gas absorption signals. Random mechanical dithering (e.g. laser beam dithering and/or sample rotation ) has been found effective in GASMAS. However, this approach converts stable interference into a random noise that must be averaged away, thus requiring longer acquisition times. Baseline recording and interference subtraction may be applicable in some GASMAS applications, as may other of the methods described above.

== Applications ==
=== Medical diagnostics ===
See

=== Optical porosimetry ===
See

=== Monitoring of drying processes ===
See

=== Pharmaceutical applications ===
See

=== Monitoring of food and food packaging ===
Much of the food that we consume today is put in a wide variety of packages to ensure food quality and provide a possibility for transportation and distribution. Many of these packages are air or gas tight, making it difficult to study the gas composition without perforation. In many cases it is of great value to study the composition of gases without destroying the package.

The perhaps best example is studies of the amount of oxygen in food packages. Oxygen is naturally present in most food and food packages as it is a major component in air. However, oxygen is also one of the great causes or needs for aging of biological substances, due to its source for increase of chemical and microbiological activity. Today, methods like [Modified atmosphere] (MAP) and [Controlled atmosphere] packaging (CAP) are implemented to reduce and control the oxygen content in food packages to prolong [shelf life] and ensure safe food. To assure the effectiveness of these methods it is important to regularly measure the concentration of oxygen (and other gases) inside these packages. GASMAS provides the possibility of doing this non-intrusively, without destroying any food or packages. The two main advantages of measuring the gas-composition in packages without perforation is that no food is wasted in the controlling process and that the same package can be controlled repeatedly during an extended time period to monitor any time-dependence of the gas composition. The studies can be used to guarantee the tightness of packages but also to study food deterioration processes.

Much food itself contains free gas distributed in pores within. Examples are fruit, bread, flour, beans, cheese, etc. Also this gas can be of great value to study to monitor quality and maturity level (see e.g. and).

=== Spectroscopy of gas confined in nanoporous materials ===
See
