= Photothermal optical microscopy =

Photothermal optical microscopy / "photothermal single particle microscopy" is a technique that is based on detection of non-fluorescent labels. It relies on absorption properties of labels (gold nanoparticles, semiconductor nanocrystals, etc.), and can be realized on a conventional microscope using a resonant modulated heating beam, non-resonant probe beam and lock-in detection of photothermal signals from a single nanoparticle. It is the extension of the macroscopic photothermal spectroscopy to the nanoscopic domain. The high sensitivity and selectivity of photothermal microscopy allows even the detection of single molecules by their absorption. Similar to Fluorescence Correlation Spectroscopy (FCS), the photothermal signal may be recorded with respect to time to study the diffusion and advection characteristics of absorbing nanoparticles in a solution. This technique is called photothermal correlation spectroscopy (PhoCS).

== Forward detection scheme ==
In this detection scheme a conventional scanning sample or laser-scanning transmission microscope is employed. Both the heating and the probing laser beam are coaxially aligned and superimposed using a dichroic mirror. Both beams are focused onto a sample, typically via a high-NA illumination microscope objective, and recollected using a detection microscope objective. The thereby collimated transmitted beam is then imaged onto a photodiode after filtering out the heating beam. The photothermal signal is then the change $\Delta$ in the transmitted probe beam power $P_d$ due to the heating laser. To increase the signal-to-noise ratio a lock-in technique may be used. To this end, the heating laser beam is modulated at a high frequency of the order of MHz and the detected probe beam power is then demodulated on the same frequency. For quantitative measurements, the photothermal signal may be normalized to the background detected power $P_{d,0}$ (which is typically much larger than the change $\Delta P_d$), thereby defining the relative photothermal signal $\Phi$

$\Phi=\frac{\Delta P_d}{P_{d,0}}=\frac{P_d\left(\text{heating beam on}\right)-P_d\left(\text{heating beam off}\right)}{P_d\left(\text{background, no particle}\right)}$

=== Detection mechanism ===
The physical basis for the photothermal signal in the transmission detection scheme is the lensing action of the refractive index profile that is created upon the absorption of the heating laser power by the nanoparticle. The signal is homodyne in the sense that a steady state difference signal accounts for the mechanism and the forward scattered field's self-interference with the transmitted beam corresponds to an energy redistribution as expected for a simple lens. The lens is a Gradient Refractive INdex (GRIN) particle determined by the 1/r refractive index profile established due to the point-source temperature profile around the nanoparticle. For a nanoparticle of radius $R$ embedded in a homogeneous medium of refractive index $n_0$ with a thermorefractive coefficient $\mathrm{d}n/\mathrm{d}T$ the refractive index profile reads:

$n\left(\mathbf{r}\right)=n_0 + \frac{\mathrm{d}n}{\mathrm{d}T}\Delta T\left(\mathbf{r}\right)=n_0+\Delta n \frac{R}{r}$

in which the contrast of the thermal lens is determined by the nanoparticle absorption cross-section $\sigma_{\rm abs}$ at the heating beam wavelength, the heating beam intensity $I_h$ at the point of the particle and the embedding medium's thermal conductivity $\kappa$ via $\Delta n=\left(\mathrm{d}n/\mathrm{d}T\right)\sigma_{\rm abs} I_h/4\pi\kappa R$. Although the signal can be well-explained in a scattering framework, the most intuitive description can be found by an intuitive analogy to the Coulomb scattering of wave packets in particle physics.

== Backwards detection scheme ==
In this detection scheme a conventional scanning sample or laser-scanning transmission microscope is employed. Both the heating and the probing laser beam are coaxially aligned and superimposed using a dichroic mirror. Both beams are focused onto a sample, typically via a high-NA illumination microscope objective. Alternatively, the probe-beam may be laterally displaced with respect to the heating beam. The retroreflected probe-beam power is then imaged onto a photodiode and the change as induced by the heating beam provides the photothermal signal

=== Detection mechanism ===
The detection is heterodyne in the sense that the scattered field of the probe beam by the thermal lens interferes in the backwards direction with a well-defined retroreflected part of the incidence probing beam.
