= Multipass spectroscopic absorption cell =

Pfund Cell - An early multipass absorption cell

A multiple-pass or long path absorption cell is commonly used in spectroscopy to measure low-concentration components or to observe weak spectra in gases or liquids. Several important advances were made in this area beginning in the 1930s, and research into a wide range of applications continues to the present day.

== Functional overview ==
Generally the goal of this type of sample cell is to improve detection sensitivity by increasing the total optical path length that travels through a small, constant sample volume. In principle, a longer path length results in greater detection sensitivity. Focusing mirrors must be used to redirect the beam at each reflection point, resulting in the beam being restricted to a predefined space along a controlled path until it exits the optical cavity. The output of the cell is the input of an optical detector (a specialized type of transducer), which senses specific changes in the properties of the beam that occur during interaction with the test sample. For instance, the sample may absorb energy from the beam, resulting in an attenuation of the output that is detectable by the transducer. Two conventional multipass cells are called the White cell and Herriott cell.

== Pfund cell ==
In the late 1930s August Pfund used a triple-pass cell like the one shown above for atmospheric study. The cell, which became known as the Pfund cell, is constructed using two identical spherical mirrors, each having a hole carefully machined into its center. The separation distance between the mirrors is equal to the mirror focal length. A source enters from a hole in either mirror, is redirected twice at two reflection points, and then exits the cell through the other mirror on the third pass. The Pfund cell was one of the earliest examples of this type of spectroscopic technique and is noted for having used multiple passes.

== White cell ==
White cell animation - Count 8 reflective passes

The White cell was first described in 1942 by John U. White in his paper Long Optical Paths of Large Aperture, and was a significant improvement over previous long path spectroscopic measurement techniques. A White cell is constructed using three spherical, concave mirrors having the same radius of curvature. The mirrors are separated by a distance equal to their radii of curvature. The animation on the right shows a White Cell in which a beam makes eight reflective passes or traversals. The number of traversals can be changed quite easily by making slight rotational adjustments to either M2 or M3; however, the total number of traversals must always occur in multiples of four. The entering and exiting beams do not change position as traversals are added or removed, while the total number of traversals can be increased many times without changing the volume of the cell, and therefore the total optical path length can be made large compared to the volume of the sample under test. The spots from various passes can overlap on mirrors M2 and M3 but must be distinct on mirror M1. If the input beam is focused in the plane of M1, then each round trip will also be focused in this plane. The tighter the focus, the more nonoverlapping spots there can be on M1 and thus the higher the maximum pathlength.

At present the White cell is still the most commonly used multipass cell and provides many advantages. For example,

- The number of traversals is easily controlled
- It allows for high numerical aperture
- It is reasonably stable (but not as stable as the Herriott cell)

White cells are available with path lengths ranging from less than a meter to many hundreds of meters.

== Herriott cell ==
Herriott cell - Adjust D to change the number of passes

The Herriott cell first appeared in 1965 when Donald R. Herriott and Harry J. Schulte published Folded Optical Delay Lines while at Bell Laboratories. The Herriott cell is made up of two opposing spherical mirrors. A hole is machined into one of the mirrors to allow the input and output beams to enter and exit the cavity. Alternatively, the beam may exit through a hole in the opposite mirror. In this fashion the Herriott cell can support multiple light sources by providing multiple entrance and exit holes in either of the mirrors. Unlike the White cell, the number of traversals is controlled by adjusting the separation distance D between the two mirrors. This cell is also commonly used and has some advantages over the White cell:

- It is simpler than the White cell with only two mirrors that are easier to position and less susceptible to mechanical disturbance of the cell
- Can be more stable than the White cell

However, the Herriot cell does not accept high numerical aperture beams. In addition, larger sized mirrors must be used when longer path lengths are needed.

== Circular multipass cells ==
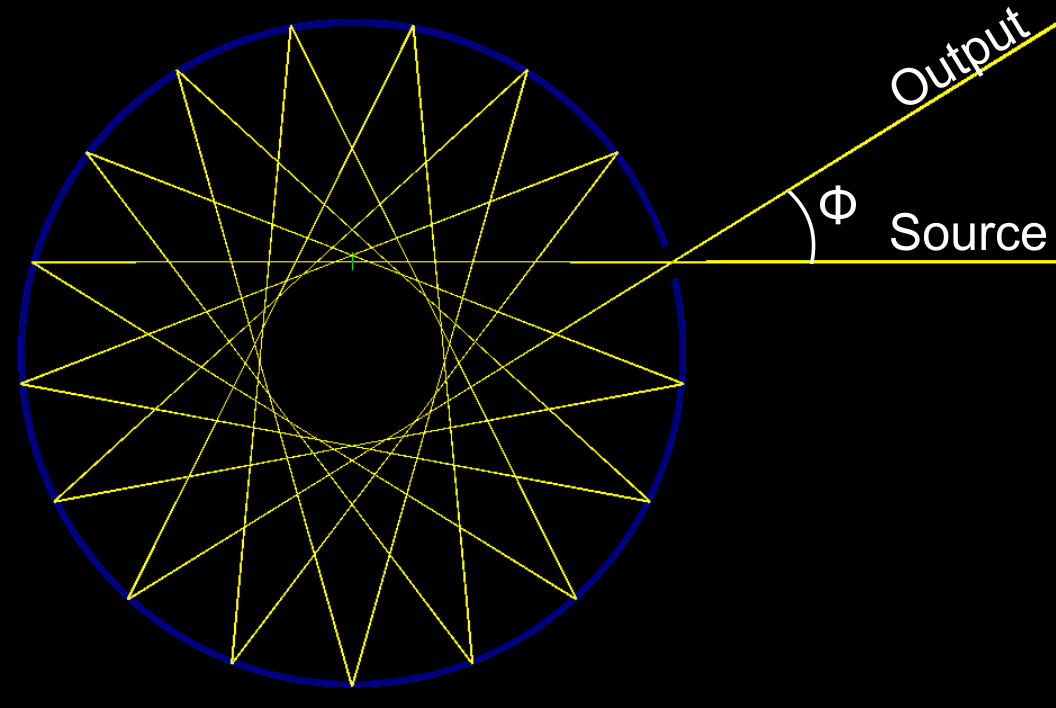
Circular Multipass Cell - The beam propagates on a star pattern. The path length can be adjusted by changing the incidence angle Φ.

Another category of multipass cells is generally referred to as circular multipass reflection cells. They were first introduced by Thoma and co-workers in 1994. Such cells rely on a circular arrangement of mirrors. The beam enters the cell under an angle and propagates on a star-shaped pattern (see picture on the right). The path length in circular multipass cells can be varied by adjusting the incidence angle of the beam. An advantage lies in their robustness towards mechanical stress such as vibrations or temperature changes. Furthermore, circular multipass cells stand out because of the small detection volumes they provide. A stable beam propagation is achieved by shaping individual reflection points to form a non-concentric mirror-arrangement. In a special case, a circular mirror is used, allowing continuous adjustment of the angle of incidence. A drawback of this circular cell configuration is the inherent concentric mirror arrangement which leads to imperfect imaging after a large number of reflections.

== Raymond cell ==
Animated schematic of a Raymond Cell (Shared Focus Sample Cell), showing multiple pairs of toroidal mirrors refocusing the beam through a small sample at the center.

The Raymond cell, also known as the Shared Focus Sample Cell (SFSC), is a multipass optical cell invented by Joseph R. Demers in 2020 for performing Terahertz spectroscopy on solid samples. It employs multiple pairs of toroidal mirrors arranged so that the beam is repeatedly refocused into the center of the chamber while being propagated around the cavity. This geometry allows many passes through a very small liquid or solid sample placed at the shared focal point, thereby increasing sensitivity while minimizing the required sample volume. Unlike circular multipass cells, the Raymond cell permits the beam to pass directly through the center of the cavity while maintaining a well-formed image during propagation. However, due to the nature of the toroidal mirrors employed, alignment can be more tedious and overall cost higher than in conventional multipass designs.

== See also ==
- Laser absorption spectrometry
- Tunable diode laser absorption spectroscopy
- Terahertz spectroscopy
- Optical system
- Absorption spectroscopy
- Infrared spectroscopy
- Absorption (optics)
- Optical density
- Optical depth
- Reflectivity
