= Fluence response =

Both fluence rates and irradiance of light are important signals for plants and are detected by phytochrome. Exploiting different modes of photoreversibility in this molecule allow plants to respond to different levels of light. There are three main types of fluence rate governed responses that are brought about by different levels of light.

== Very low fluence responses ==
As the name would suggest this type of response is triggered by very low levels of light and is thought to be mediated by phytochrome A. It can be initiated by fluences as low as 0.0001μmol/m^{2} up to about 0.05μmol/m^{2}. Germination of Arabidopsis can be induced with very low levels of red light, as can oat seedlings. Such low levels of light are sufficient for inducing this response, since they only convert 0.02% of the phytochrome to its active form. The backward reaction by far red light is only 98% efficient making the conversion non-photoreversible and allowing the response to proceed. VLFRs can also be induced by making up the required fluence by brief flashes of light. Since this depends on light levels and time it is known as the law of reciprocity.

== Low fluence responses ==
These responses require at least 1μmol/m^{2} to be initiated and become saturated at about 1000μmol/m^{2}. Unlike VLFRs, these responses are photoreversible. This was shown by exposing lettuce seed to a brief flash of red light causing germination. It was then shown, if this red flash was followed by a flash of far red light, germination was again inhibited. LFRs also follow the law of reciprocity. Other examples of LFRs include leaf de-etiolation and enhancement of rate of chlorophyll production.

== High-irradiance responses ==
HIRs require long exposure to relatively high light levels. The degree of response will depend on the level of light. They are characterised by the fact that they do not follow the law of reciprocity and depend on the rate of photons hitting the leaf surface, as opposed to the total light levels. This means that neither long exposure to dim levels of light nor very bright flashes of light are enough to trigger these responses. HIR does not show red and far red photoreversibility and does not obey the law of reciprocity.
