= Stefan–Boltzmann law =

Physical law on the emissive power of black body

Total emitted energy, $j \equiv M^{\circ}$, of a black body as a function of its temperature, $T$. The upper (black) curve depicts the Stefan–Boltzmann law, $M^{\circ} = \sigma\,T^4$. The lower (blue) curve is total energy according to the Wien approximation, $M^{\circ}_{W} = M^{\circ} / \zeta(4) \approx 0.924 \, \sigma T^{4} \!\,$

The Stefan–Boltzmann law, also known as Stefan's law, describes the intensity of the thermal radiation emitted by matter in terms of that matter's temperature. It is named for Josef Stefan, who empirically derived the relationship, and Ludwig Boltzmann who derived the law theoretically.

For an ideal absorber/emitter or black body, the Stefan–Boltzmann law states that the total energy radiated per unit surface area per unit time (also known as the radiant exitance) is directly proportional to the fourth power of the black body's temperature, $T$:
$$M^{\circ} = \sigma\, T^{4}.$$

The constant of proportionality, $\sigma$, is called the Stefan–Boltzmann constant. It has the value

σ = 5.670374419...×10^{−8} W⋅m^{−2}⋅K^{−4}.

In the general case, the Stefan–Boltzmann law for radiant exitance takes the form:
$$M = \varepsilon\, M^{\circ} = \varepsilon\,\sigma\, T^4 ,$$
where $\varepsilon$ is the emissivity of the surface emitting the radiation. The emissivity is generally between zero and one. An emissivity of one corresponds to a black body.

== Detailed explanation ==
The radiant exitance (previously called radiant emittance), $M$, has dimensions of energy flux (energy per unit time per unit area), and the SI units of measure are joules per second per square metre (J⋅s^{−1}⋅m^{−2}), or equivalently, watts per square meter (W⋅m^{−2}). The SI unit for absolute temperature, T, is the kelvin (K).

To find the total power, $P$, radiated from an object, multiply the radiant exitance by the object's surface area, $A$:
$$P = A \cdot M = A \, \varepsilon\,\sigma\, T^{4}.$$

Matter that does not absorb all incident radiation emits less total energy than a black body. Emissions are reduced by a factor $\varepsilon$, where the emissivity, $\varepsilon$, is a material property which, for most matter, satisfies $0 \leq \varepsilon \leq 1$. Emissivity can in general depend on wavelength, direction, and polarization. However, the emissivity which appears in the non-directional form of the Stefan–Boltzmann law is the hemispherical total emissivity, which reflects emissions as totaled over all wavelengths, directions, and polarizations.

The form of the Stefan–Boltzmann law that includes emissivity is applicable to all matter, provided that matter is in a state of local thermodynamic equilibrium (LTE) so that its temperature is well-defined. (This is a trivial conclusion, since the emissivity, $\varepsilon$, is defined to be the quantity that makes this equation valid. What is non-trivial is the proposition that $\varepsilon \leq 1$, which is a consequence of Kirchhoff's law of thermal radiation.)

A so-called grey body is a body for which the spectral emissivity is independent of wavelength, so that the total emissivity, $\varepsilon$, is a constant. In the more general (and realistic) case, the spectral emissivity depends on wavelength. The total emissivity, as applicable to the Stefan–Boltzmann law, may be calculated as a weighted average of the spectral emissivity, with the blackbody emission spectrum serving as the weighting function. It follows that if the spectral emissivity depends on wavelength then the total emissivity depends on the temperature, i.e., $\varepsilon = \varepsilon(T)$. However, if the dependence on wavelength is small, then the dependence on temperature will be small as well.

Wavelength- and subwavelength-scale particles, metamaterials, and other nanostructures are not subject to ray-optical limits and may be designed to have an emissivity greater than 1.

In national and international standards documents, the symbol $M$ is recommended to denote radiant exitance; a superscript circle (°) indicates a term relative to a black body. (A subscript "e" is added when it is important to distinguish the energetic (radiometric) quantity radiant exitance, $M_\mathrm{e}$, from the analogous human vision (photometric) quantity, luminous exitance, denoted $M_\mathrm{v}$.) In common usage, the symbol used for radiant exitance (often called radiant emittance) varies among different texts and in different fields.

The Stefan–Boltzmann law may be expressed as a formula for radiance as a function of temperature. Radiance is measured in watts per square metre per steradian (W⋅m^{−2}⋅sr^{−1}). The Stefan–Boltzmann law for the radiance of a black body is:
$$L^\circ_\Omega = \frac{M^{\circ}}\pi = \frac\sigma\pi\, T^{4}.$$

The Stefan–Boltzmann law expressed as a formula for radiation energy density is:
$$w^\circ_\mathrm{e} = \frac{4}{c} \, M^\circ = \frac{4}{c} \, \sigma\, T^{4} ,$$
where $c$ is the speed of light.

== History ==
In 1864, John Tyndall presented measurements of the infrared emission by a platinum filament and the corresponding color of the filament. The proportionality to the fourth power of the absolute temperature was deduced by Josef Stefan (1835–1893) in 1877 on the basis of Tyndall's experimental measurements, in the article Über die Beziehung zwischen der Wärmestrahlung und der Temperatur (On the relationship between thermal radiation and temperature) in the Bulletins from the sessions of the Vienna Academy of Sciences.

A derivation of the law from theoretical considerations was presented by Ludwig Boltzmann (1844–1906) in 1884, drawing upon the work of Adolfo Bartoli. Bartoli in 1876 had derived the existence of radiation pressure from the principles of thermodynamics. Following Bartoli, Boltzmann considered an ideal heat engine using electromagnetic radiation instead of an ideal gas as working matter.

The law was almost immediately experimentally verified. Heinrich Weber in 1888 pointed out deviations at higher temperatures, but perfect accuracy within measurement uncertainties was confirmed up to temperatures of 1535 K by 1897. The law, including the theoretical prediction of the Stefan–Boltzmann constant as a function of the speed of light, the Boltzmann constant and the Planck constant, is a direct consequence of Planck's law as formulated in 1900.

== Stefan–Boltzmann constant ==
The Stefan–Boltzmann constant, σ, is derived from other known physical constants:
$$\sigma = \frac{2 \pi^5 k^4}{15 c^2 h^3} = \frac{\pi^2 k^4}{60 c^2 \hbar^3}$$
where k is the Boltzmann constant, the h is the Planck constant (with $\hbar = h/2\pi$ the reduced Planck constant), and c is the speed of light in vacuum.

As of the 2019 revision of the SI, which establishes exact fixed values for k, h, and c, the Stefan–Boltzmann constant is exactly:
$$\sigma = \left[\frac{2 \pi^5 \left( 1.380\ 649 \times 10^{-23} \right)^4}{15 \left(2.997\ 924\ 58 \times 10^8 \right)^2 \left(6.626\ 070\ 15 \times 10^{-34} \right)^3}\right]\,\frac{\mathrm{W}}{\mathrm{m}^2{\cdot}\mathrm{K}^4}$$
Thus,

σ = 5.670374419...×10^{−8} W⋅m^{−2}⋅K^{−4} (sequence A081820 in the OEIS).

Prior to this, the value of $\sigma$ was calculated from the measured value of the gas constant.

The numerical value of the Stefan–Boltzmann constant is different in other systems of units, as shown in the table below.

Stefan–Boltzmann constant, σ
| Context | Value | Units |
|---|---|---|
| SI | 5.670374419...×10^{−8} | W⋅m^{−2}⋅K^{−4} |
| CGS | 5.670374419...×10^{−5} | erg⋅cm^{−2}⋅s^{−1}⋅K^{−4} |
| US customary units | 1.713441...×10^{−9} | BTU⋅hr^{−1}⋅ft^{−2}⋅°R^{−4} |
| Thermochemistry | 1.170937...×10^{−7} | cal⋅cm^{−2}⋅day^{−1}⋅K^{−4} |

== Examples ==
=== Temperature of the Sun ===
Log–log graphs of peak emission wavelength and radiant exitance vs. black-body temperature. Red arrows show that 5780 K black bodies have 501 nm peak and 63.3 MW/m^{2} radiant exitance.

With his law, Stefan also determined the temperature of the Sun's surface. He inferred from the data of Jacques-Louis Soret (1827–1890) that the energy flux density from the Sun is 29 times greater than the energy flux density of a certain warmed metal lamella (a thin plate). A round lamella was placed at such a distance from the measuring device that it would be seen at the same angular diameter as the Sun. Soret estimated the temperature of the lamella to be approximately 1900 °C to 2000 °C. Stefan surmised that 1/3 of the energy flux from the Sun is absorbed by the Earth's atmosphere, so he took for the correct Sun's energy flux a value 3/2 times greater than Soret's value, namely 29 × 3/2 = 43.5.

Precise measurements of atmospheric absorption were not made until 1888 and 1904. The temperature Stefan obtained was a median value of previous ones, 1950 °C and the absolute thermodynamic one 2200 K. As 2.57^{4} = 43.5, it follows from the law that the temperature of the Sun is 2.57 times greater than the temperature of the lamella, so Stefan got a value of 5430 °C or 5700 K. This was the first sensible value for the temperature of the Sun. Before this, values ranging from as low as 1800 °C to as high as 13000000 °C were claimed. The lower value of 1800 °C was determined by Claude Pouillet (1790–1868) in 1838 using the Dulong–Petit law. Pouillet also took just half the value of the Sun's correct energy flux.

=== Temperature of stars ===
The temperature of stars other than the Sun can be approximated using a similar means by treating the emitted energy as a black body radiation. So:
$$L = 4 \pi R^2 \sigma T^4$$
where L is the luminosity, σ is the Stefan–Boltzmann constant, R is the stellar radius and T is the effective temperature. This formula can then be rearranged to calculate the temperature:
$$T = \sqrt[4]{\frac{L}{4 \pi R^2 \sigma}}$$
or alternatively the radius:
$$R = \sqrt{\frac{L}{4 \pi \sigma T^4}}$$

The same formulae can also be simplified to compute the parameters relative to the Sun:
$$\begin{align}
\frac{L}{L_\odot} &= \left(\frac{R}{R_\odot}\right)^2 \left(\frac{T}{T_\odot}\right)^4 \\[1ex]
\frac{T}{T_\odot} &= \left(\frac{L}{L_\odot}\right)^{1/4} \left(\frac{R_\odot}{R}\right)^{1/2} \\[1ex]
\frac{R}{R_\odot} &= \left(\frac{T_\odot}{T}\right)^2 \left(\frac{L}{L_\odot}\right)^{1/2}
\end{align}$$
where $R_\odot$ is the solar radius, and so forth. They can also be rewritten in terms of the surface area A and radiant exitance $M^{\circ}$:
$$\begin{align}
L &= A M^{\circ} \\[1ex]
M^{\circ} &= \frac{L}{A} \\[1ex]
A &= \frac{L}{M^{\circ}}
\end{align}$$
where $A = 4 \pi R^2$ and $M^{\circ} = \sigma T^{4}.$

With the Stefan–Boltzmann law, astronomers can easily infer the radii of stars. The law is also met in the thermodynamics of black holes in so-called Hawking radiation.

=== Effective temperature of the Earth ===
Similarly we can calculate the effective temperature of the Earth T_{⊕} by equating the energy received from the Sun and the energy radiated by the Earth, under the black-body approximation (Earth's own production of energy being small enough to be negligible). The luminosity of the Sun, L_{☉}, is given by:
$$L_\odot = 4\pi R_\odot^2 \sigma T_\odot^4$$

At Earth, this energy is passing through a sphere with a radius of a_{0}, the distance between the Earth and the Sun, and the irradiance (received power per unit area) is given by
$$E_\oplus = \frac{L_\odot}{4\pi a_0^2}$$

The Earth has a radius of R_{⊕}, and therefore has a cross-section of $\pi R_\oplus^2$. The radiant flux (i.e. solar power) absorbed by the Earth is thus given by:
$$\Phi_\text{abs} = \pi R_\oplus^2 \times E_\oplus$$

Because the Stefan–Boltzmann law uses a fourth power, it has a stabilizing effect on the exchange and the flux emitted by Earth tends to be equal to the flux absorbed, close to the steady state where:
$$\begin{align}
4\pi R_\oplus^2 \sigma T_\oplus^4 &= \pi R_\oplus^2 \times E_\oplus \\
&= \pi R_\oplus^2 \times \frac{4\pi R_\odot^2\sigma T_\odot^4}{4\pi a_0^2} \\
\end{align}$$

T_{⊕} can then be found:
$$\begin{align}
T_\oplus^4 &= \frac{R_\odot^2 T_\odot^4}{4 a_0^2} \\
T_\oplus &= T_\odot \times \sqrt\frac{R_\odot}{2 a_0} \\
& = 5780 \; {\rm K} \times \sqrt{6.957 \times 10^{8} \; {\rm m} \over 2 \times 1.495\ 978\ 707 \times 10^{11} \; {\rm m} } \\
& \approx 279 \; {\rm K}
\end{align}$$
where T_{☉} is the temperature of the Sun, R_{☉} the radius of the Sun, and a_{0} is the distance between the Earth and the Sun. This gives an effective temperature of 6 °C on the surface of the Earth, assuming that it perfectly absorbs all emission falling on it and has no atmosphere.

The Earth has an albedo of 0.3, meaning that 30% of the solar radiation that hits the planet gets scattered back into space without absorption. The effect of albedo on temperature can be approximated by assuming that the energy absorbed is multiplied by 0.7, but that the planet still radiates as a black body (the latter by definition of effective temperature, which is what we are calculating). This approximation reduces the temperature by a factor of 0.7^{1/4}, giving 255 K (−18 °C; −1 °F).

The above temperature is Earth's as seen from space, not ground temperature but an average over all emitting bodies of Earth from surface to high altitude. Because of the greenhouse effect, the Earth's actual average surface temperature is about 288 K (15 °C; 59 °F), which is higher than the 255 K (−18 °C; −1 °F) effective temperature, and even higher than the 279 K (6 °C; 43 °F) temperature that a black body would have.

In the above discussion, we have assumed that the whole surface of the earth is at one temperature. Another interesting question is to ask what the temperature of a blackbody surface on the earth would be assuming that it reaches equilibrium with the sunlight falling on it. This of course depends on the angle of the sun on the surface and on how much air the sunlight has gone through. When the sun is at the zenith and the surface is horizontal, the irradiance can be as high as 1120 W/m^{2}. The Stefan–Boltzmann law then gives a temperature of
$$T=\left(\frac{1120\text{ W/m}^2}\sigma\right)^{1/4}\approx 375\text{ K}$$
or 102 °C (216 °F). (Above the atmosphere, the result is even higher: 394 K (121 °C; 250 °F).) We can think of the earth's surface as "trying" to reach equilibrium temperature during the day, but being cooled by the atmosphere, and "trying" to reach equilibrium with starlight and possibly moonlight at night, but being warmed by the atmosphere.

== Origination ==
=== Thermodynamic derivation of the energy density ===
The fact that the energy density of the box containing radiation is proportional to $T^{4}$ can be derived using thermodynamics. This derivation uses the relation between the radiation pressure p and the internal energy density $u$, a relation that can be shown using the form of the electromagnetic stress–energy tensor. This relation is:
$$p = \frac{u}{3}.$$

Now, from the fundamental thermodynamic relation
$$dU = T \, dS - p \, dV,$$
we obtain the following expression, after dividing by $dV$ and fixing $T$:
$$\left(\frac{\partial U}{\partial V}\right)_T = T \left(\frac{\partial S}{\partial V}\right)_T - p = T \left(\frac{\partial p}{\partial T}\right)_V - p.$$

The last equality comes from the following Maxwell relation:
$$\left(\frac{\partial S}{\partial V}\right)_T = \left(\frac{\partial p}{\partial T}\right)_V.$$

From the definition of energy density it follows that
$$U = u V$$
where the energy density of radiation only depends on the temperature, therefore
$$\left(\frac{\partial U}{\partial V}\right)_T = u \left(\frac{\partial V}{\partial V}\right)_T = u.$$

Now, the equality is
$$u = T \left(\frac{\partial p}{\partial T}\right)_V - p,$$
after substitution of $\left(\frac{\partial U}{\partial V}\right)_{T}.$

Meanwhile, the pressure is the rate of momentum change per unit area. Since the momentum of a photon is the same as the energy divided by the speed of light,
$$u = \frac{T}{3} \left(\frac{\partial u}{\partial T}\right)_V - \frac{u}{3},$$
where the factor 1/3 comes from the projection of the momentum transfer onto the normal to the wall of the container.

Since the partial derivative $\left(\frac{\partial u}{\partial T}\right)_V$ can be expressed as a relationship between only $u$ and $T$ (if one isolates it on one side of the equality), the partial derivative can be replaced by the ordinary derivative. After separating the differentials the equality becomes
$$\frac{du}{4u} = \frac{dT}{T},$$
which leads immediately to $u = A T^4$, with $A$ as some constant of integration.

=== Derivation from Planck's law ===
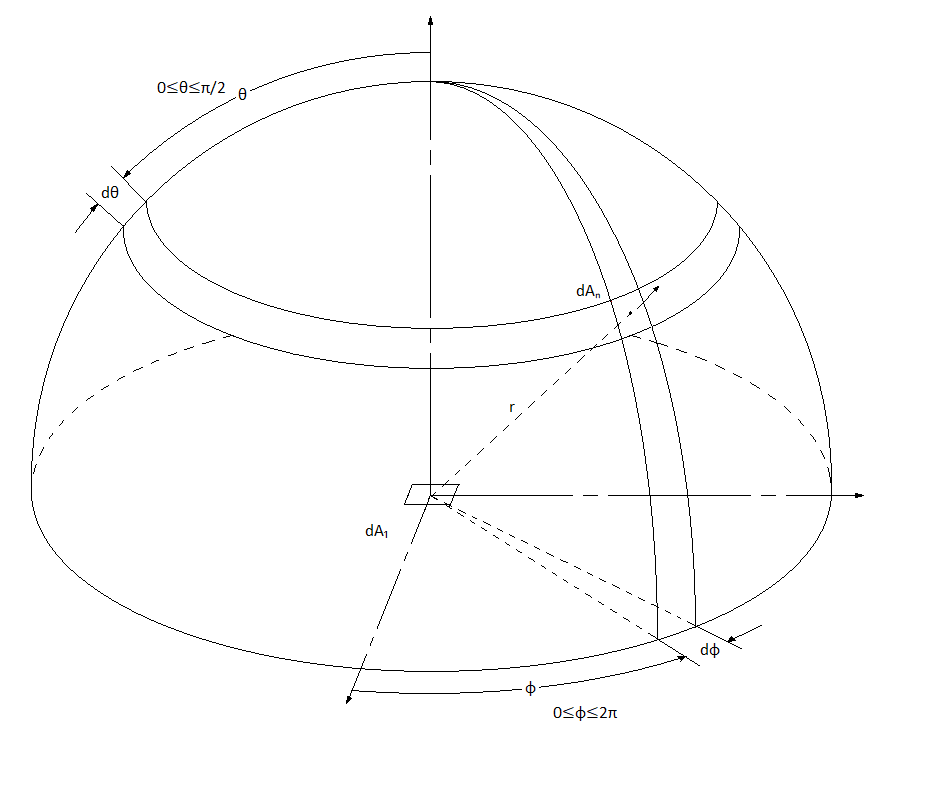
Deriving the Stefan–Boltzmann Law using Planck's law.

The law can be derived by considering a small flat black body surface radiating out into a half-sphere. This derivation uses spherical coordinates, with θ as the zenith angle and φ as the azimuthal angle; and the small flat blackbody surface lies on the xy-plane, where θ = ^{π}/_{2}.

The intensity of the light emitted from the blackbody surface is given by Planck's law,
$$I(\nu,T) =\frac{2 h\nu^3}{c^2}\frac{1}{ e^{h\nu/(kT)}-1},$$
where

- $I(\nu,T)$ is the amount of power per unit surface area per unit solid angle per unit frequency emitted at a frequency $\nu$ by a black body at temperature T.
- $h$ is the Planck constant
- $c$ is the speed of light, and
- $k$ is the Boltzmann constant.

The quantity $I(\nu,T) ~A \cos \theta ~d\nu ~d\Omega$ is the power radiated by a surface of area A through a solid angle dΩ in the frequency range between ν and ν + dν.

The Stefan–Boltzmann law gives the power emitted per unit area of the emitting body,
$$\frac{P}{A} = \int_0^\infty I(\nu,T) \, d\nu \int \cos \theta \, d\Omega$$

Note that the cosine appears because black bodies are Lambertian (i.e. they obey Lambert's cosine law), meaning that the intensity observed along the sphere will be the actual intensity times the cosine of the zenith angle. To derive the Stefan–Boltzmann law, we must integrate $d\Omega = \sin \theta\, d\theta \, d\varphi$ over the half-sphere and integrate $\nu$ from 0 to ∞.

$$\begin{align}
\frac{P}{A} & = \int_0^\infty I(\nu,T) \, d\nu \int_0^{2\pi} \, d\varphi \int_0^{\pi/2} \cos \theta \sin \theta \, d\theta  \\
& = \pi \int_0^\infty I(\nu,T) \, d\nu
\end{align}$$

Then we plug in for I:
$$\frac{P}{A} = \frac{2 \pi h}{c^2} \int_0^\infty \frac{\nu^3}{ e^{\frac{h\nu}{kT}} - 1} \, d\nu$$

To evaluate this integral, do a substitution,
$$\begin{align}
u & = \frac{h \nu}{k T} \\[6pt]
du & = \frac{h}{k T} \, d\nu
\end{align}$$
which gives:
$$\frac{P}{A} = \frac{2 \pi h }{c^2} \left(\frac{k T}{h} \right)^4 \int_0^\infty \frac{u^3}{ e^u - 1} \, du .$$

The integral on the right is standard and goes by many names: it is a particular case of a Bose–Einstein integral, the polylogarithm, or the Riemann zeta function $\zeta(s)$. The value of the integral is $\Gamma(4)\zeta(4) = \frac{\pi^4}{15}$ (where $\Gamma(s)$ is the Gamma function), giving the result that, for a perfect blackbody surface:
$$M^\circ
= \sigma T^4 ~, ~~
\sigma = \frac{2 \pi^5 k^4 }{15 c^2 h^3}
= \frac{\pi^2 k^4}{60 \hbar^3 c^2}.$$

Finally, this proof started out only considering a small flat surface. However, any differentiable surface can be approximated by a collection of small flat surfaces. So long as the geometry of the surface does not cause the blackbody to reabsorb its own radiation, the total energy radiated is just the sum of the energies radiated by each surface; and the total surface area is just the sum of the areas of each surface—so this law holds for all convex blackbodies, too, so long as the surface has the same temperature throughout. The law extends to radiation from non-convex bodies by using the fact that the convex hull of a black body radiates as though it were itself a black body.

=== Energy density ===
The total energy density u can be similarly calculated, except the integration is over the whole sphere and there is no cosine, and the energy flux (U c) should be divided by the velocity c to give the energy density u:
$$u = \frac{1}{c} \int_0^\infty I(\nu,T) \, d\nu \int \, d\Omega$$
Thus $\int_0^{\pi/2} \cos \theta \sin \theta \, d\theta$ is replaced by $\int_0^{\pi} \sin \theta \, d\theta$, giving an extra factor of 4.

Thus, in total:
$$u = \frac{4}{c} \, \sigma \, T^4$$
The product $\frac{4}{c} \sigma$ is sometimes known as the radiation constant or radiation density constant.

== Decomposition in terms of photons ==
The Stefan–Boltzmann law can be expressed as
$$M^{\circ} = \sigma\, T^4 = N_\mathrm{phot} \, \langle E_\mathrm{phot} \rangle$$
where the flux of photons, $N_\mathrm{phot}$, is given by
$$N_\mathrm{phot} = \pi \int_0^\infty \frac{B_\nu}{h\nu}\,\mathrm{d}\nu$$
$$N_\mathrm{phot} = \left({ 1.5205\times10^{15}} \; \textrm{photons}{\cdot}\textrm{s}^{-1}{\cdot}\textrm{m}^{-2}{\cdot}\mathrm{K}^{-3}\right)\cdot T^3$$
and the average energy per photon,$\langle E_\textrm{phot}\rangle$, is given by
$$\langle E_\textrm{phot}\rangle = \frac{\pi^4}{30\,\zeta(3)} k\,T= \left({3.7294 \times 10^{-23}} \mathrm{J}{\cdot}\mathrm{K}^{-1}\right) \cdot T\,.$$

Marr and Wilkin (2012) recommend that students be taught about $\langle E_\textrm{phot}\rangle$ instead of being taught Wien's displacement law, and that the above decomposition be taught when the Stefan–Boltzmann law is taught.

== See also ==
- Black-body radiation
- Rayleigh–Jeans law
- Sakuma–Hattori equation
