= Radiosity (radiometry) =

Physical quantity in radiometry

- Common symbols: $J_\mathrm{e}$
- SI unit: W·m^{−2}
- Other units: erg·cm^{−2}·s^{−1}
- Dimension: M T^{−3}

In radiometry, radiosity is the radiant flux leaving (emitted, reflected and transmitted by) a surface per unit area, and spectral radiosity is the radiosity of a surface per unit frequency or wavelength, depending on whether the spectrum is taken as a function of frequency or of wavelength. The SI unit of radiosity is the watt per square metre (W/m^{2}), while that of spectral radiosity in frequency is the watt per square metre per hertz (W·m^{−2}·Hz^{−1}) and that of spectral radiosity in wavelength is the watt per square metre per metre (W·m^{−3})—commonly the watt per square metre per nanometre (W·m^{−2}·nm^{−1}). The CGS unit erg per square centimeter per second (erg·cm^{−2}·s^{−1}) is often used in astronomy. Radiosity is often called intensity in branches of physics other than radiometry, but in radiometry this usage leads to confusion with radiant intensity.

== Mathematical definitions ==
=== Radiosity ===
Radiosity of a surface, denoted J_{e} ("e" for "energetic", to avoid confusion with photometric quantities), is defined as

$$J_\mathrm{e} = \frac{\partial \Phi_\mathrm{e}}{\partial A} = J_\mathrm{e,em} + J_\mathrm{e,r} + J_\mathrm{e,tr},$$

where

- ∂ is the partial derivative symbol
- $\Phi_e$ is the radiant flux leaving (emitted, reflected and transmitted)
- $A$ is the area
- $J_{e,em} = M_e$ is the emitted component of the radiosity of the surface, that is to say its exitance
- $J_{e,r}$ is the reflected component of the radiosity of the surface
- $J_{e,tr}$ is the transmitted component of the radiosity of the surface

For an opaque surface, the transmitted component of radiosity J_{e,tr} vanishes and only two components remain:

$$J_\mathrm{e} = M_\mathrm{e} + J_\mathrm{e,r}.$$

In heat transfer, combining these two factors into one radiosity term helps in determining the net energy exchange between multiple surfaces.

=== Spectral radiosity ===
Spectral radiosity in frequency of a surface, denoted J_{e,ν}, is defined as

$$J_{\mathrm{e},\nu} = \frac{\partial J_\mathrm{e}}{\partial \nu},$$

where ν is the frequency.

Spectral radiosity in wavelength of a surface, denoted J_{e,λ}, is defined as

$$J_{\mathrm{e},\lambda} = \frac{\partial J_\mathrm{e}}{\partial \lambda},$$

where λ is the wavelength.

== Radiosity method ==
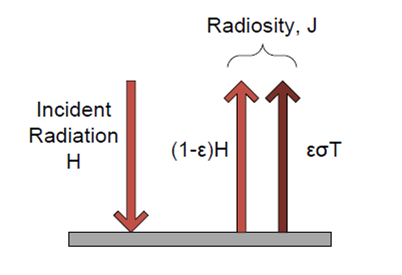
The two radiosity components of an opaque surface.

The radiosity of an opaque, gray and diffuse surface is given by

$$J_\mathrm{e} = M_\mathrm{e} + J_\mathrm{e,r} = \varepsilon \sigma T^4 + (1 - \varepsilon) E_\mathrm{e},$$

where

- ε is the emissivity of that surface;
- σ is the Stefan–Boltzmann constant;
- T is the temperature of that surface;
- E_{e} is the irradiance of that surface.

Normally, E_{e} is the unknown variable and will depend on the surrounding surfaces. So, if some surface i is being hit by radiation from some other surface j, then the radiation energy incident on surface i is E_{e,ji} A_{i} = F_{ji} A_{j} J_{e,j} where F_{ji} is the view factor or shape factor, from surface j to surface i. So, the irradiance of surface i is the sum of radiation energy from all other surfaces per unit surface of area A_{i}:

$$E_{\mathrm{e},i} = \frac{\sum_{j = 1}^N F_{ji}A_j J_{\mathrm{e},j}}{A_i}.$$

Now, employing the reciprocity relation for view factors F_{ji} A_{j} = F_{ij} A_{i},

$$E_{\mathrm{e},i} = \sum_{j = 1}^N F_{ij} J_{\mathrm{e},j},$$

and substituting the irradiance into the equation for radiosity, produces

$$J_{\mathrm{e},i} = \varepsilon_i \sigma T_i^4 + (1 - \varepsilon_i)\sum_{j = 1}^N F_{ij} J_{\mathrm{e},j}.$$

For an N surface enclosure, this summation for each surface will generate N linear equations with N unknown radiosities, and N unknown temperatures. For an enclosure with only a few surfaces, this can be done by hand. But, for a room with many surfaces, linear algebra and a computer are necessary.

Once the radiosities have been calculated, the net heat transfer $\dot Q_i$ at a surface can be determined by finding the difference between the incoming and outgoing energy:

$$\dot Q_i = A_i\left(J_{\mathrm{e},i} - E_{\mathrm{e},i}\right).$$

Using the equation for radiosity J_{e,i} = ε_{i}σT_{i}^{4} + (1 − ε_{i})E_{e,i}, the irradiance can be eliminated from the above to obtain

$$\dot Q_i = \frac{A_i \varepsilon_i}{1 - \varepsilon_i}\left(\sigma T_i^4 - J_{\mathrm{e},i}\right) = \frac{A_i \varepsilon_i}{1 - \varepsilon_i}\left(M_{\mathrm{e},i}^\circ - J_{\mathrm{e},i}\right),$$

where M_{e,i}° is the radiant exitance of a black body.

== Circuit analogy ==
For an enclosure consisting of only a few surfaces, it is often easier to represent the system with an analogous circuit rather than solve the set of linear radiosity equations. To do this, the heat transfer at each surface is expressed as

$$\dot{Q_i} = \frac{M_{\mathrm{e},i}^\circ - J_{\mathrm{e},i}}{R_i},$$

where R_{i} = (1 − ε_{i})/(A_{i}ε_{i}) is the resistance of the surface.

Likewise, M_{e,i}^{°} − J_{e,i} is the blackbody exitance minus the radiosity and serves as the 'potential difference'. These quantities are formulated to resemble those from an electrical circuit V = IR.

Now performing a similar analysis for the heat transfer from surface i to surface j,

$$\dot Q_{ij} = A_i F_{ij} (J_{\mathrm{e},i} - J_{\mathrm{e},j}) = \frac{J_{\mathrm{e},i} - J_{\mathrm{e},j}}{R_{ij}},$$

where R_{ij} = 1/(A_{i} F_{ij}).

Because the above is between surfaces, R_{ij} is the resistance of the space between the surfaces and J_{e,i} − J_{e,j} serves as the potential difference.

Combining the surface elements and space elements, a circuit is formed. The heat transfer is found by using the appropriate potential difference and equivalent resistances, similar to the process used in analyzing electrical circuits.

== Other methods ==
In the radiosity method and circuit analogy, several assumptions were made to simplify the model. The most significant is that the surface is a diffuse emitter. In such a case, the radiosity does not depend on the angle of incidence of reflecting radiation and this information is lost on a diffuse surface. In reality, however, the radiosity will have a specular component from the reflected radiation. So, the heat transfer between two surfaces relies on both the view factor and the angle of reflected radiation.

It was also assumed that the surface is a gray body, that is to say its emissivity is independent of radiation frequency or wavelength. However, if the range of radiation spectrum is large, this will not be the case. In such an application, the radiosity must be calculated spectrally and then integrated over the range of radiation spectrum.

Yet another assumption is that the surface is isothermal. If it is not, then the radiosity will vary as a function of position along the surface. However, this problem is solved by simply subdividing the surface into smaller elements until the desired accuracy is obtained.

== SI radiometry units ==
SI radiometry units
Quantity		Unit		Dimension	Notes
Name	Symbol (Note: Standards organizations recommend that radiometric quantities should be denoted with suffix "e" (for "energetic") to avoid confusion with photometric or photon quantities.)	Name	Symbol	Dimension	Notes
Radiant energy	Q_{e} (Note: Alternative symbols sometimes seen: W or E for radiant energy, P or F for radiant flux, I for irradiance, W for radiant exitance.)	joule	J	M⋅L^{2}⋅T^{−2}	Energy of electromagnetic radiation.
Radiant energy density	w_{e}	joule per cubic metre	J/m^{3}	M⋅L^{−1}⋅T^{−2}	Radiant energy per unit volume.
Radiant flux	Φ_{e}	watt	W = J/s	M⋅L^{2}⋅T^{−3}	Radiant energy emitted, reflected, transmitted or received, per unit time. This is sometimes also called "radiant power", and called luminosity in astronomy.
Spectral flux	Φ_{e,ν} (Note: Spectral quantities given per unit frequency are denoted with suffix "ν" (Greek letter nu, not to be confused with a letter "v", indicating a photometric quantity.))	watt per hertz	W/Hz	M⋅L^{2}⋅T^{−2}	Radiant flux per unit frequency or wavelength. The latter is commonly measured in W⋅nm^{−1}.
Spectral flux	Φ_{e,λ} (Note: Spectral quantities given per unit wavelength are denoted with suffix "λ".)	watt per metre	W/m	M⋅L⋅T^{−3}	Radiant flux per unit frequency or wavelength. The latter is commonly measured in W⋅nm^{−1}.
Radiant intensity	I_{e,Ω} (Note: Directional quantities are denoted with suffix "Ω".)	watt per steradian	W/sr	M⋅L^{2}⋅T^{−3}	Radiant flux emitted, reflected, transmitted or received, per unit solid angle. This is a directional quantity.
Spectral intensity	I_{e,Ω,ν}	watt per steradian per hertz	W⋅sr^{−1}⋅Hz^{−1}	M⋅L^{2}⋅T^{−2}	Radiant intensity per unit frequency or wavelength. The latter is commonly measured in W⋅sr^{−1}⋅nm^{−1}. This is a directional quantity.
Spectral intensity	I_{e,Ω,λ}	watt per steradian per metre	W⋅sr^{−1}⋅m^{−1}	M⋅L⋅T^{−3}	Radiant intensity per unit frequency or wavelength. The latter is commonly measured in W⋅sr^{−1}⋅nm^{−1}. This is a directional quantity.
Radiance	L_{e,Ω}	watt per steradian per square metre	W⋅sr^{−1}⋅m^{−2}	M⋅T^{−3}	Radiant flux emitted, reflected, transmitted or received by a surface, per unit solid angle per unit projected area. This is a directional quantity. This is sometimes also called "intensity".
Spectral radiance Specific intensity	L_{e,Ω,ν}	watt per steradian per square metre per hertz	W⋅sr^{−1}⋅m^{−2}⋅Hz^{−1}	M⋅T^{−2}	Radiance of a surface per unit frequency or wavelength. The latter is commonly measured in W⋅sr^{−1}⋅m^{−2}⋅nm^{−1}. This is a directional quantity. This is sometimes also called "spectral intensity".
Spectral radiance Specific intensity	L_{e,Ω,λ}	watt per steradian per square metre, per metre	W⋅sr^{−1}⋅m^{−3}	M⋅L^{−1}⋅T^{−3}	Radiance of a surface per unit frequency or wavelength. The latter is commonly measured in W⋅sr^{−1}⋅m^{−2}⋅nm^{−1}. This is a directional quantity. This is sometimes also called "spectral intensity".
Irradiance Flux density	E_{e}	watt per square metre	W/m^{2}	M⋅T^{−3}	Radiant flux received by a surface per unit area. This is sometimes also called "intensity".
Spectral irradiance Spectral flux density	E_{e,ν}	watt per square metre per hertz	W⋅m^{−2}⋅Hz^{−1}	M⋅T^{−2}	Irradiance of a surface per unit frequency or wavelength. This is sometimes also called "spectral intensity". Non-SI units of spectral flux density include jansky (1 Jy = 10^{−26} W⋅m^{−2}⋅Hz^{−1}) and solar flux unit (1 sfu = 10^{−22} W⋅m^{−2}⋅Hz^{−1} = 10^{4} Jy).
Spectral irradiance Spectral flux density	E_{e,λ}	watt per square metre, per metre	W/m^{3}	M⋅L^{−1}⋅T^{−3}	Irradiance of a surface per unit frequency or wavelength. This is sometimes also called "spectral intensity". Non-SI units of spectral flux density include jansky (1 Jy = 10^{−26} W⋅m^{−2}⋅Hz^{−1}) and solar flux unit (1 sfu = 10^{−22} W⋅m^{−2}⋅Hz^{−1} = 10^{4} Jy).
Radiosity	J_{e}	watt per square metre	W/m^{2}	M⋅T^{−3}	Radiant flux leaving (emitted, reflected and transmitted by) a surface per unit area. This is sometimes also called "intensity".
Spectral radiosity	J_{e,ν}	watt per square metre per hertz	W⋅m^{−2}⋅Hz^{−1}	M⋅T^{−2}	Radiosity of a surface per unit frequency or wavelength. The latter is commonly measured in W⋅m^{−2}⋅nm^{−1}. This is sometimes also called "spectral intensity".
Spectral radiosity	J_{e,λ}	watt per square metre, per metre	W/m^{3}	M⋅L^{−1}⋅T^{−3}	Radiosity of a surface per unit frequency or wavelength. The latter is commonly measured in W⋅m^{−2}⋅nm^{−1}. This is sometimes also called "spectral intensity".
Radiant exitance	M_{e}	watt per square metre	W/m^{2}	M⋅T^{−3}	Radiant flux emitted by a surface per unit area. This is the emitted component of radiosity. "Radiant emittance" is an old term for this quantity. This is sometimes also called "intensity".
Spectral exitance	M_{e,ν}	watt per square metre per hertz	W⋅m^{−2}⋅Hz^{−1}	M⋅T^{−2}	Radiant exitance of a surface per unit frequency or wavelength. The latter is commonly measured in W⋅m^{−2}⋅nm^{−1}. "Spectral emittance" is an old term for this quantity. This is sometimes also called "spectral intensity".
Spectral exitance	M_{e,λ}	watt per square metre, per metre	W/m^{3}	M⋅L^{−1}⋅T^{−3}	Radiant exitance of a surface per unit frequency or wavelength. The latter is commonly measured in W⋅m^{−2}⋅nm^{−1}. "Spectral emittance" is an old term for this quantity. This is sometimes also called "spectral intensity".
Radiant exposure	H_{e}	joule per square metre	J/m^{2}	M⋅T^{−2}	Radiant energy received by a surface per unit area, or equivalently irradiance of a surface integrated over time of irradiation. This is sometimes also called "radiant fluence".
Spectral exposure	H_{e,ν}	joule per square metre per hertz	J⋅m^{−2}⋅Hz^{−1}	M⋅T^{−1}	Radiant exposure of a surface per unit frequency or wavelength. The latter is commonly measured in J⋅m^{−2}⋅nm^{−1}. This is sometimes also called "spectral fluence".
Spectral exposure	H_{e,λ}	joule per square metre, per metre	J/m^{3}	M⋅L^{−1}⋅T^{−2}	Radiant exposure of a surface per unit frequency or wavelength. The latter is commonly measured in J⋅m^{−2}⋅nm^{−1}. This is sometimes also called "spectral fluence".
See also: SI; Radiometry; Photometry

== See also ==
- Irradiance
- Radiant flux
- Spectral flux density
