= Camera calibration =

Camera calibration may refer to:

- Camera resectioning, which is also called geometric camera calibration
- Color mapping, which is a method for photometric camera calibration
- Radiometric calibration
