= Radiant exitance =

Radiant flux per unit area

In radiometry, radiant exitance or radiant emittance is the radiant flux emitted by a surface per unit area, whereas spectral exitance or spectral emittance is the radiant exitance of a surface per unit frequency or wavelength, depending on whether the spectrum is taken as a function of frequency or of wavelength. This is the emitted component of radiosity. The SI unit of radiant exitance is the watt per square metre (W/m^{2}), while that of spectral exitance in frequency is the watt per square metre per hertz (W·m^{−2}·Hz^{−1}) and that of spectral exitance in wavelength is the watt per square metre per metre (W·m^{−3})—commonly the watt per square metre per nanometre (W·m^{−2}·nm^{−1}). The CGS unit erg per square centimeter per second (erg·cm^{−2}·s^{−1}) is often used in astronomy. Radiant exitance is often called "intensity" in branches of physics other than radiometry, but in radiometry this usage leads to confusion with radiant intensity.

== Mathematical definitions ==
=== Radiant exitance ===
Radiant exitance of a surface, denoted M_{e} ("e" for "energetic", to avoid confusion with photometric quantities), is defined as
$$M_\mathrm{e} = \frac{\partial \Phi_\mathrm{e}}{\partial A},$$
where ∂ is the partial derivative symbol, Φ_{e} is the radiant flux emitted, and A is the surface area.

The radiant flux received by a surface is called irradiance.

The radiant exitance of a black surface, according to the Stefan–Boltzmann law, is equal to:
$$M_\mathrm{e}^\circ = \sigma T^4,$$
where σ is the Stefan–Boltzmann constant, and T is the temperature of that surface. For a real surface, the radiant exitance is equal to:
$$M_\mathrm{e} = \varepsilon M_\mathrm{e}^\circ = \varepsilon \sigma T^4,$$
where ε is the emissivity of that surface.

=== Spectral exitance ===
Spectral exitance in frequency of a surface, denoted M_{e,ν}, is defined as

$$M_{\mathrm{e},\nu} = \frac{\partial M_\mathrm{e}}{\partial \nu},$$

where ν is the frequency.

Spectral exitance in wavelength of a surface, denoted M_{e,λ}, is defined as
$$M_{\mathrm{e},\lambda} = \frac{\partial M_\mathrm{e}}{\partial \lambda},$$
where λ is the wavelength.

The spectral exitance of a black surface around a given frequency or wavelength, according to Lambert's cosine law and Planck's law, is equal to:

$$\begin{align}
M_{\mathrm{e},\nu}^\circ & = \pi L_{\mathrm{e},\Omega,\nu}^\circ = \frac{2\pi h\nu^3}{c^2} \frac{1}{e^\frac{h\nu}{kT} - 1}, \\[8pt]
M_{\mathrm{e},\lambda}^\circ & = \pi L_{\mathrm{e},\Omega,\lambda}^\circ = \frac{2\pi hc^2}{\lambda^5} \frac{1}{e^\frac{hc}{\lambda kT} - 1},
\end{align}$$

where h is the Planck constant, ν is the frequency, λ is the wavelength, k is the Boltzmann constant, c is the speed of light in vacuum, T is the temperature of that surface. For a real surface, the spectral exitance is equal to:
$$\begin{align}
M_{\mathrm{e},\nu} & = \varepsilon M_{\mathrm{e},\nu}^\circ = \frac{2\pi h\varepsilon \nu^3}{c^2} \frac{1}{e^\frac{h\nu}{kT} - 1}, \\[8pt]
M_{\mathrm{e},\lambda} & = \varepsilon M_{\mathrm{e},\lambda}^\circ = \frac{2\pi h\varepsilon c^2}{\lambda^5} \frac{1}{e^\frac{hc}{\lambda kT} - 1}.
\end{align}$$
where $\varepsilon$ is the emittance of the surface.

== SI radiometry units ==
SI radiometry units
Quantity		Unit		Dimension	Notes
Name	Symbol (Note: Standards organizations recommend that radiometric quantities should be denoted with suffix "e" (for "energetic") to avoid confusion with photometric or photon quantities.)	Name	Symbol	Dimension	Notes
Radiant energy	Q_{e} (Note: Alternative symbols sometimes seen: W or E for radiant energy, P or F for radiant flux, I for irradiance, W for radiant exitance.)	joule	J	M⋅L^{2}⋅T^{−2}	Energy of electromagnetic radiation.
Radiant energy density	w_{e}	joule per cubic metre	J/m^{3}	M⋅L^{−1}⋅T^{−2}	Radiant energy per unit volume.
Radiant flux	Φ_{e}	watt	W = J/s	M⋅L^{2}⋅T^{−3}	Radiant energy emitted, reflected, transmitted or received, per unit time. This is sometimes also called "radiant power", and called luminosity in astronomy.
Spectral flux	Φ_{e,ν} (Note: Spectral quantities given per unit frequency are denoted with suffix "ν" (Greek letter nu, not to be confused with a letter "v", indicating a photometric quantity.))	watt per hertz	W/Hz	M⋅L^{2}⋅T^{−2}	Radiant flux per unit frequency or wavelength. The latter is commonly measured in W⋅nm^{−1}.
Spectral flux	Φ_{e,λ} (Note: Spectral quantities given per unit wavelength are denoted with suffix "λ".)	watt per metre	W/m	M⋅L⋅T^{−3}	Radiant flux per unit frequency or wavelength. The latter is commonly measured in W⋅nm^{−1}.
Radiant intensity	I_{e,Ω} (Note: Directional quantities are denoted with suffix "Ω".)	watt per steradian	W/sr	M⋅L^{2}⋅T^{−3}	Radiant flux emitted, reflected, transmitted or received, per unit solid angle. This is a directional quantity.
Spectral intensity	I_{e,Ω,ν}	watt per steradian per hertz	W⋅sr^{−1}⋅Hz^{−1}	M⋅L^{2}⋅T^{−2}	Radiant intensity per unit frequency or wavelength. The latter is commonly measured in W⋅sr^{−1}⋅nm^{−1}. This is a directional quantity.
Spectral intensity	I_{e,Ω,λ}	watt per steradian per metre	W⋅sr^{−1}⋅m^{−1}	M⋅L⋅T^{−3}	Radiant intensity per unit frequency or wavelength. The latter is commonly measured in W⋅sr^{−1}⋅nm^{−1}. This is a directional quantity.
Radiance	L_{e,Ω}	watt per steradian per square metre	W⋅sr^{−1}⋅m^{−2}	M⋅T^{−3}	Radiant flux emitted, reflected, transmitted or received by a surface, per unit solid angle per unit projected area. This is a directional quantity. This is sometimes also called "intensity".
Spectral radiance Specific intensity	L_{e,Ω,ν}	watt per steradian per square metre per hertz	W⋅sr^{−1}⋅m^{−2}⋅Hz^{−1}	M⋅T^{−2}	Radiance of a surface per unit frequency or wavelength. The latter is commonly measured in W⋅sr^{−1}⋅m^{−2}⋅nm^{−1}. This is a directional quantity. This is sometimes also called "spectral intensity".
Spectral radiance Specific intensity	L_{e,Ω,λ}	watt per steradian per square metre, per metre	W⋅sr^{−1}⋅m^{−3}	M⋅L^{−1}⋅T^{−3}	Radiance of a surface per unit frequency or wavelength. The latter is commonly measured in W⋅sr^{−1}⋅m^{−2}⋅nm^{−1}. This is a directional quantity. This is sometimes also called "spectral intensity".
Irradiance Flux density	E_{e}	watt per square metre	W/m^{2}	M⋅T^{−3}	Radiant flux received by a surface per unit area. This is sometimes also called "intensity".
Spectral irradiance Spectral flux density	E_{e,ν}	watt per square metre per hertz	W⋅m^{−2}⋅Hz^{−1}	M⋅T^{−2}	Irradiance of a surface per unit frequency or wavelength. This is sometimes also called "spectral intensity". Non-SI units of spectral flux density include jansky (1 Jy = 10^{−26} W⋅m^{−2}⋅Hz^{−1}) and solar flux unit (1 sfu = 10^{−22} W⋅m^{−2}⋅Hz^{−1} = 10^{4} Jy).
Spectral irradiance Spectral flux density	E_{e,λ}	watt per square metre, per metre	W/m^{3}	M⋅L^{−1}⋅T^{−3}	Irradiance of a surface per unit frequency or wavelength. This is sometimes also called "spectral intensity". Non-SI units of spectral flux density include jansky (1 Jy = 10^{−26} W⋅m^{−2}⋅Hz^{−1}) and solar flux unit (1 sfu = 10^{−22} W⋅m^{−2}⋅Hz^{−1} = 10^{4} Jy).
Radiosity	J_{e}	watt per square metre	W/m^{2}	M⋅T^{−3}	Radiant flux leaving (emitted, reflected and transmitted by) a surface per unit area. This is sometimes also called "intensity".
Spectral radiosity	J_{e,ν}	watt per square metre per hertz	W⋅m^{−2}⋅Hz^{−1}	M⋅T^{−2}	Radiosity of a surface per unit frequency or wavelength. The latter is commonly measured in W⋅m^{−2}⋅nm^{−1}. This is sometimes also called "spectral intensity".
Spectral radiosity	J_{e,λ}	watt per square metre, per metre	W/m^{3}	M⋅L^{−1}⋅T^{−3}	Radiosity of a surface per unit frequency or wavelength. The latter is commonly measured in W⋅m^{−2}⋅nm^{−1}. This is sometimes also called "spectral intensity".
Radiant exitance	M_{e}	watt per square metre	W/m^{2}	M⋅T^{−3}	Radiant flux emitted by a surface per unit area. This is the emitted component of radiosity. "Radiant emittance" is an old term for this quantity. This is sometimes also called "intensity".
Spectral exitance	M_{e,ν}	watt per square metre per hertz	W⋅m^{−2}⋅Hz^{−1}	M⋅T^{−2}	Radiant exitance of a surface per unit frequency or wavelength. The latter is commonly measured in W⋅m^{−2}⋅nm^{−1}. "Spectral emittance" is an old term for this quantity. This is sometimes also called "spectral intensity".
Spectral exitance	M_{e,λ}	watt per square metre, per metre	W/m^{3}	M⋅L^{−1}⋅T^{−3}	Radiant exitance of a surface per unit frequency or wavelength. The latter is commonly measured in W⋅m^{−2}⋅nm^{−1}. "Spectral emittance" is an old term for this quantity. This is sometimes also called "spectral intensity".
Radiant exposure	H_{e}	joule per square metre	J/m^{2}	M⋅T^{−2}	Radiant energy received by a surface per unit area, or equivalently irradiance of a surface integrated over time of irradiation. This is sometimes also called "radiant fluence".
Spectral exposure	H_{e,ν}	joule per square metre per hertz	J⋅m^{−2}⋅Hz^{−1}	M⋅T^{−1}	Radiant exposure of a surface per unit frequency or wavelength. The latter is commonly measured in J⋅m^{−2}⋅nm^{−1}. This is sometimes also called "spectral fluence".
Spectral exposure	H_{e,λ}	joule per square metre, per metre	J/m^{3}	M⋅L^{−1}⋅T^{−2}	Radiant exposure of a surface per unit frequency or wavelength. The latter is commonly measured in J⋅m^{−2}⋅nm^{−1}. This is sometimes also called "spectral fluence".
See also: SI; Radiometry; Photometry

Comparison of photometric and radiometric quantities

== See also ==
- Radiosity
