= Radiant intensity =

Intensity of electromagnetic radiation

In radiometry, radiant intensity is the radiant flux emitted, reflected, transmitted or received, per unit solid angle, and spectral intensity is the radiant intensity per unit frequency or wavelength, depending on whether the spectrum is taken as a function of frequency or of wavelength. These are directional quantities. The SI unit of radiant intensity is the watt per steradian (W/sr), while that of spectral intensity in frequency is the watt per steradian per hertz (W·sr^{−1}·Hz^{−1}) and that of spectral intensity in wavelength is the watt per steradian per metre (W·sr^{−1}·m^{−1})—commonly the watt per steradian per nanometre (W·sr^{−1}·nm^{−1}). Radiant intensity is distinct from irradiance and radiant exitance, which are often called intensity in branches of physics other than radiometry. In radio-frequency engineering, radiant intensity is sometimes called radiation intensity.

== Mathematical definitions ==
Comparison of photometric and radiometric quantities

=== Radiant intensity ===
Radiant intensity, denoted I_{e,Ω} ("e" for "energetic", to avoid confusion with photometric quantities, and "Ω" to indicate this is a directional quantity), is defined as

$$I_{\mathrm{e},\Omega} = \frac{\partial \Phi_\mathrm{e}}{\partial \Omega},$$

where

- ∂ is the partial derivative symbol;
- Φ_{e} is the radiant flux emitted, reflected, transmitted or received;
- Ω is the solid angle.

In general, I_{e,Ω} is a function of viewing angle θ and potentially azimuth angle. For the special case of a Lambertian surface, I_{e,Ω} follows the Lambert's cosine law I_{e,Ω} = I_{0} cos θ.

When calculating the radiant intensity emitted by a source, Ω refers to the solid angle into which the light is emitted. When calculating radiance received by a detector, Ω refers to the solid angle subtended by the source as viewed from that detector.

=== Spectral intensity ===
Spectral intensity in frequency, denoted I_{e,Ω,ν}, is defined as

$$I_{\mathrm{e},\Omega,\nu} = \frac{\partial I_{\mathrm{e},\Omega}}{\partial \nu},$$

where ν is the frequency.

Spectral intensity in wavelength, denoted I_{e,Ω,λ}, is defined as

$$I_{\mathrm{e},\Omega,\lambda} = \frac{\partial I_{\mathrm{e},\Omega}}{\partial \lambda},$$

where λ is the wavelength.

== Radio-frequency engineering ==
Radiant intensity is used to characterize the emission of radiation by an antenna:

$$I_{\mathrm{e},\Omega} = E_\mathrm{e}(r) \, r^2,$$

where

- E_{e} is the irradiance of the antenna;
- r is the distance from the antenna.

Unlike power density, radiant intensity does not depend on distance: because radiant intensity is defined as the power through a solid angle, the decreasing power density over distance due to the inverse-square law is offset by the increase in area with distance.

== SI radiometry units ==
SI radiometry units
| Quantity | | Unit | | Dimension | Notes |
| Name | Symbol (Note: Standards organizations recommend that radiometric quantities should be denoted with suffix "e" (for "energetic") to avoid confusion with photometric or photon quantities.) | Name | Symbol | Dimension | Notes |
|---|---|---|---|---|---|
| Radiant energy | Q_{e} (Note: Alternative symbols sometimes seen: W or E for radiant energy, P or F for radiant flux, I for irradiance, W for radiant exitance.) | joule | J | M⋅L^{2}⋅T^{−2} | Energy of electromagnetic radiation. |
| Radiant energy density | w_{e} | joule per cubic metre | J/m^{3} | M⋅L^{−1}⋅T^{−2} | Radiant energy per unit volume. |
| Radiant flux | Φ_{e} | watt | W = J/s | M⋅L^{2}⋅T^{−3} | Radiant energy emitted, reflected, transmitted or received, per unit time. This is sometimes also called "radiant power", and called luminosity in astronomy. |
| Spectral flux | Φ_{e,ν} (Note: Spectral quantities given per unit frequency are denoted with suffix "ν" (Greek letter nu, not to be confused with a letter "v", indicating a photometric quantity.)) | watt per hertz | W/Hz | M⋅L^{2}⋅T^{−2} | Radiant flux per unit frequency or wavelength. The latter is commonly measured in W⋅nm^{−1}. |
| Spectral flux | Φ_{e,λ} (Note: Spectral quantities given per unit wavelength are denoted with suffix "λ".) | watt per metre | W/m | M⋅L⋅T^{−3} | Radiant flux per unit frequency or wavelength. The latter is commonly measured in W⋅nm^{−1}. |
| Radiant intensity | I_{e,Ω} (Note: Directional quantities are denoted with suffix "Ω".) | watt per steradian | W/sr | M⋅L^{2}⋅T^{−3} | Radiant flux emitted, reflected, transmitted or received, per unit solid angle. This is a directional quantity. |
| Spectral intensity | I_{e,Ω,ν} | watt per steradian per hertz | W⋅sr^{−1}⋅Hz^{−1} | M⋅L^{2}⋅T^{−2} | Radiant intensity per unit frequency or wavelength. The latter is commonly measured in W⋅sr^{−1}⋅nm^{−1}. This is a directional quantity. |
| Spectral intensity | I_{e,Ω,λ} | watt per steradian per metre | W⋅sr^{−1}⋅m^{−1} | M⋅L⋅T^{−3} | Radiant intensity per unit frequency or wavelength. The latter is commonly measured in W⋅sr^{−1}⋅nm^{−1}. This is a directional quantity. |
| Radiance | L_{e,Ω} | watt per steradian per square metre | W⋅sr^{−1}⋅m^{−2} | M⋅T^{−3} | Radiant flux emitted, reflected, transmitted or received by a surface, per unit solid angle per unit projected area. This is a directional quantity. This is sometimes also confusingly called "intensity". |
| Spectral radiance Specific intensity | L_{e,Ω,ν} | watt per steradian per square metre per hertz | W⋅sr^{−1}⋅m^{−2}⋅Hz^{−1} | M⋅T^{−2} | Radiance of a surface per unit frequency or wavelength. The latter is commonly measured in W⋅sr^{−1}⋅m^{−2}⋅nm^{−1}. This is a directional quantity. This is sometimes also confusingly called "spectral intensity". |
| Spectral radiance Specific intensity | L_{e,Ω,λ} | watt per steradian per square metre, per metre | W⋅sr^{−1}⋅m^{−3} | M⋅L^{−1}⋅T^{−3} | Radiance of a surface per unit frequency or wavelength. The latter is commonly measured in W⋅sr^{−1}⋅m^{−2}⋅nm^{−1}. This is a directional quantity. This is sometimes also confusingly called "spectral intensity". |
| Irradiance Flux density | E_{e} | watt per square metre | W/m^{2} | M⋅T^{−3} | Radiant flux received by a surface per unit area. This is sometimes also confusingly called "intensity". |
| Spectral irradiance Spectral flux density | E_{e,ν} | watt per square metre per hertz | W⋅m^{−2}⋅Hz^{−1} | M⋅T^{−2} | Irradiance of a surface per unit frequency or wavelength. This is sometimes also confusingly called "spectral intensity". Non-SI units of spectral flux density include jansky (1 Jy = 10^{−26} W⋅m^{−2}⋅Hz^{−1}) and solar flux unit (1 sfu = 10^{−22} W⋅m^{−2}⋅Hz^{−1} = 10^{4} Jy). |
| Spectral irradiance Spectral flux density | E_{e,λ} | watt per square metre, per metre | W/m^{3} | M⋅L^{−1}⋅T^{−3} | Irradiance of a surface per unit frequency or wavelength. This is sometimes also confusingly called "spectral intensity". Non-SI units of spectral flux density include jansky (1 Jy = 10^{−26} W⋅m^{−2}⋅Hz^{−1}) and solar flux unit (1 sfu = 10^{−22} W⋅m^{−2}⋅Hz^{−1} = 10^{4} Jy). |
| Radiosity | J_{e} | watt per square metre | W/m^{2} | M⋅T^{−3} | Radiant flux leaving (emitted, reflected and transmitted by) a surface per unit area. This is sometimes also confusingly called "intensity". |
| Spectral radiosity | J_{e,ν} | watt per square metre per hertz | W⋅m^{−2}⋅Hz^{−1} | M⋅T^{−2} | Radiosity of a surface per unit frequency or wavelength. The latter is commonly measured in W⋅m^{−2}⋅nm^{−1}. This is sometimes also confusingly called "spectral intensity". |
| Spectral radiosity | J_{e,λ} | watt per square metre, per metre | W/m^{3} | M⋅L^{−1}⋅T^{−3} | Radiosity of a surface per unit frequency or wavelength. The latter is commonly measured in W⋅m^{−2}⋅nm^{−1}. This is sometimes also confusingly called "spectral intensity". |
| Radiant exitance | M_{e} | watt per square metre | W/m^{2} | M⋅T^{−3} | Radiant flux emitted by a surface per unit area. This is the emitted component of radiosity. "Radiant emittance" is an old term for this quantity. This is sometimes also confusingly called "intensity". |
| Spectral exitance | M_{e,ν} | watt per square metre per hertz | W⋅m^{−2}⋅Hz^{−1} | M⋅T^{−2} | Radiant exitance of a surface per unit frequency or wavelength. The latter is commonly measured in W⋅m^{−2}⋅nm^{−1}. "Spectral emittance" is an old term for this quantity. This is sometimes also confusingly called "spectral intensity". |
| Spectral exitance | M_{e,λ} | watt per square metre, per metre | W/m^{3} | M⋅L^{−1}⋅T^{−3} | Radiant exitance of a surface per unit frequency or wavelength. The latter is commonly measured in W⋅m^{−2}⋅nm^{−1}. "Spectral emittance" is an old term for this quantity. This is sometimes also confusingly called "spectral intensity". |
| Radiant exposure | H_{e} | joule per square metre | J/m^{2} | M⋅T^{−2} | Radiant energy received by a surface per unit area, or equivalently irradiance of a surface integrated over time of irradiation. This is sometimes also called "radiant fluence". |
| Spectral exposure | H_{e,ν} | joule per square metre per hertz | J⋅m^{−2}⋅Hz^{−1} | M⋅T^{−1} | Radiant exposure of a surface per unit frequency or wavelength. The latter is commonly measured in J⋅m^{−2}⋅nm^{−1}. This is sometimes also called "spectral fluence". |
| Spectral exposure | H_{e,λ} | joule per square metre, per metre | J/m^{3} | M⋅L^{−1}⋅T^{−2} | Radiant exposure of a surface per unit frequency or wavelength. The latter is commonly measured in J⋅m^{−2}⋅nm^{−1}. This is sometimes also called "spectral fluence". |
See also: SI; Radiometry; Photometry

Comparison of photometric and radiometric quantities

== See also ==
- Candela
- Luminous intensity
