= Radiosity =

Radiosity may refer to:

- Radiosity (radiometry), the total radiation (emitted plus reflected) leaving a surface, certainly including the reflected radiation and the emitted radiation.
- Radiosity (computer graphics), a rendering algorithm which gives a realistic rendering of shadows and diffuse light.
