= Radiant energy =

Energy carried by electromagnetic or gravitational radiation

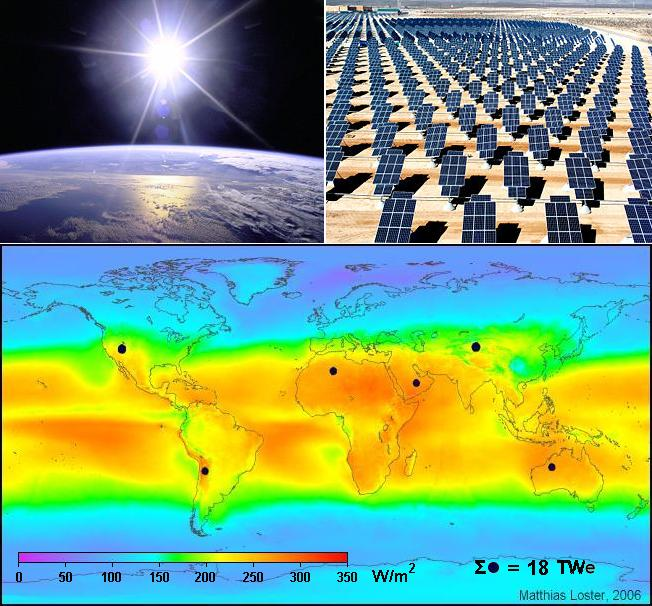
Visible light such as sunlight carries radiant energy, which is used in solar power generation.

In physics, and in particular as measured by radiometry, radiant energy is the energy of electromagnetic and gravitational radiation. As energy, its SI unit is the joule (J). The quantity of radiant energy may be calculated by integrating radiant flux (or power) with respect to time. The symbol Q_{e} is often used throughout literature to denote radiant energy ("e" for "energetic", to avoid confusion with photometric quantities). In branches of physics other than radiometry, electromagnetic energy is referred to using E or W. The term is used particularly when electromagnetic radiation is emitted by a source into the surrounding environment. This radiation may be visible or invisible to the human eye.

== Terminology use and history ==
The term "radiant energy" is most commonly used in the fields of radiometry, solar energy, heating and lighting, but is also sometimes used in other fields (such as telecommunications). In modern applications involving transmission of power from one location to another, "radiant energy" is sometimes used to refer to the electromagnetic waves themselves, rather than their energy (a property of the waves). In the past, the term "electro-radiant energy" has also been used.

The term "radiant energy" also applies to gravitational radiation. For example, the first gravitational waves ever observed were produced by a black hole collision that emitted about 5.3×10^{47} joules of gravitational-wave energy.

== Analysis ==
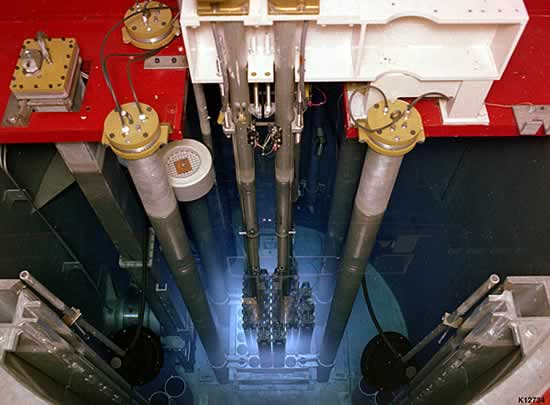
Cherenkov radiation glowing in the core of a TRIGA reactor.

Because electromagnetic (EM) radiation can be conceptualized as a stream of photons, radiant energy can be viewed as photon energy – the energy carried by these photons. Alternatively, EM radiation can be viewed as an electromagnetic wave, which carries energy in its oscillating electric and magnetic fields. These two views are completely equivalent and are reconciled to one another in quantum field theory (see wave-particle duality).

EM radiation can have various frequencies. The bands of frequency present in a given EM signal may be sharply defined, as is seen in atomic spectra, or may be broad, as in blackbody radiation. In the particle picture, the energy carried by each photon is proportional to its frequency. In the wave picture, the energy of a monochromatic wave is proportional to its intensity. This implies that if two EM waves have the same intensity, but different frequencies, the one with the higher frequency "contains" fewer photons, since each photon is more energetic.

When EM waves are absorbed by an object, the energy of the waves is converted to heat (or converted to electricity in case of a photoelectric material). This is a very familiar effect, since sunlight warms surfaces that it irradiates. Often this phenomenon is associated particularly with infrared radiation, but any kind of electromagnetic radiation will warm an object that absorbs it. EM waves can also be reflected or scattered, in which case their energy is redirected or redistributed as well.

=== Open systems ===
Radiant energy is one of the mechanisms by which energy can enter or leave an open system. Such a system can be man-made, such as a solar energy collector, or natural, such as the Earth's atmosphere. In geophysics, most atmospheric gases, including the greenhouse gases, allow the Sun's short-wavelength radiant energy to pass through to the Earth's surface, heating the ground and oceans. The absorbed solar energy is partly re-emitted as longer wavelength radiation (chiefly infrared radiation), some of which is absorbed by the atmospheric greenhouse gases. Radiant energy is produced in the sun as a result of nuclear fusion.

== Applications ==
Radiant energy is used for radiant heating. It can be generated electrically by infrared lamps, or can be absorbed from sunlight and used to heat water. The heat energy is emitted from a warm element (floor, wall, overhead panel) and warms people and other objects in rooms rather than directly heating the air. Because of this, the air temperature may be lower than in a conventionally heated building, even though the room appears just as comfortable.

Various other applications of radiant energy have been devised. These include treatment and inspection, separating and sorting, medium of control, and medium of communication. Many of these applications involve a source of radiant energy and a detector that responds to that radiation and provides a signal representing some characteristic of the radiation. Radiant energy detectors produce responses to incident radiant energy either as an increase or decrease in electric potential or current flow or some other perceivable change, such as exposure of photographic film.

== SI radiometry units ==
SI radiometry units
Quantity		Unit		Dimension	Notes
Name	Symbol (Note: Standards organizations recommend that radiometric quantities should be denoted with suffix "e" (for "energetic") to avoid confusion with photometric or photon quantities.)	Name	Symbol	Dimension	Notes
Radiant energy	Q_{e} (Note: Alternative symbols sometimes seen: W or E for radiant energy, P or F for radiant flux, I for irradiance, W for radiant exitance.)	joule	J	M⋅L^{2}⋅T^{−2}	Energy of electromagnetic radiation.
Radiant energy density	w_{e}	joule per cubic metre	J/m^{3}	M⋅L^{−1}⋅T^{−2}	Radiant energy per unit volume.
Radiant flux	Φ_{e}	watt	W = J/s	M⋅L^{2}⋅T^{−3}	Radiant energy emitted, reflected, transmitted or received, per unit time. This is sometimes also called "radiant power", and called luminosity in astronomy.
Spectral flux	Φ_{e,ν} (Note: Spectral quantities given per unit frequency are denoted with suffix "ν" (Greek letter nu, not to be confused with a letter "v", indicating a photometric quantity.))	watt per hertz	W/Hz	M⋅L^{2}⋅T^{−2}	Radiant flux per unit frequency or wavelength. The latter is commonly measured in W⋅nm^{−1}.
Spectral flux	Φ_{e,λ} (Note: Spectral quantities given per unit wavelength are denoted with suffix "λ".)	watt per metre	W/m	M⋅L⋅T^{−3}	Radiant flux per unit frequency or wavelength. The latter is commonly measured in W⋅nm^{−1}.
Radiant intensity	I_{e,Ω} (Note: Directional quantities are denoted with suffix "Ω".)	watt per steradian	W/sr	M⋅L^{2}⋅T^{−3}	Radiant flux emitted, reflected, transmitted or received, per unit solid angle. This is a directional quantity.
Spectral intensity	I_{e,Ω,ν}	watt per steradian per hertz	W⋅sr^{−1}⋅Hz^{−1}	M⋅L^{2}⋅T^{−2}	Radiant intensity per unit frequency or wavelength. The latter is commonly measured in W⋅sr^{−1}⋅nm^{−1}. This is a directional quantity.
Spectral intensity	I_{e,Ω,λ}	watt per steradian per metre	W⋅sr^{−1}⋅m^{−1}	M⋅L⋅T^{−3}	Radiant intensity per unit frequency or wavelength. The latter is commonly measured in W⋅sr^{−1}⋅nm^{−1}. This is a directional quantity.
Radiance	L_{e,Ω}	watt per steradian per square metre	W⋅sr^{−1}⋅m^{−2}	M⋅T^{−3}	Radiant flux emitted, reflected, transmitted or received by a surface, per unit solid angle per unit projected area. This is a directional quantity. This is sometimes also confusingly called "intensity".
Spectral radiance Specific intensity	L_{e,Ω,ν}	watt per steradian per square metre per hertz	W⋅sr^{−1}⋅m^{−2}⋅Hz^{−1}	M⋅T^{−2}	Radiance of a surface per unit frequency or wavelength. The latter is commonly measured in W⋅sr^{−1}⋅m^{−2}⋅nm^{−1}. This is a directional quantity. This is sometimes also confusingly called "spectral intensity".
Spectral radiance Specific intensity	L_{e,Ω,λ}	watt per steradian per square metre, per metre	W⋅sr^{−1}⋅m^{−3}	M⋅L^{−1}⋅T^{−3}	Radiance of a surface per unit frequency or wavelength. The latter is commonly measured in W⋅sr^{−1}⋅m^{−2}⋅nm^{−1}. This is a directional quantity. This is sometimes also confusingly called "spectral intensity".
Irradiance Flux density	E_{e}	watt per square metre	W/m^{2}	M⋅T^{−3}	Radiant flux received by a surface per unit area. This is sometimes also confusingly called "intensity".
Spectral irradiance Spectral flux density	E_{e,ν}	watt per square metre per hertz	W⋅m^{−2}⋅Hz^{−1}	M⋅T^{−2}	Irradiance of a surface per unit frequency or wavelength. This is sometimes also confusingly called "spectral intensity". Non-SI units of spectral flux density include jansky (1 Jy = 10^{−26} W⋅m^{−2}⋅Hz^{−1}) and solar flux unit (1 sfu = 10^{−22} W⋅m^{−2}⋅Hz^{−1} = 10^{4} Jy).
Spectral irradiance Spectral flux density	E_{e,λ}	watt per square metre, per metre	W/m^{3}	M⋅L^{−1}⋅T^{−3}	Irradiance of a surface per unit frequency or wavelength. This is sometimes also confusingly called "spectral intensity". Non-SI units of spectral flux density include jansky (1 Jy = 10^{−26} W⋅m^{−2}⋅Hz^{−1}) and solar flux unit (1 sfu = 10^{−22} W⋅m^{−2}⋅Hz^{−1} = 10^{4} Jy).
Radiosity	J_{e}	watt per square metre	W/m^{2}	M⋅T^{−3}	Radiant flux leaving (emitted, reflected and transmitted by) a surface per unit area. This is sometimes also confusingly called "intensity".
Spectral radiosity	J_{e,ν}	watt per square metre per hertz	W⋅m^{−2}⋅Hz^{−1}	M⋅T^{−2}	Radiosity of a surface per unit frequency or wavelength. The latter is commonly measured in W⋅m^{−2}⋅nm^{−1}. This is sometimes also confusingly called "spectral intensity".
Spectral radiosity	J_{e,λ}	watt per square metre, per metre	W/m^{3}	M⋅L^{−1}⋅T^{−3}	Radiosity of a surface per unit frequency or wavelength. The latter is commonly measured in W⋅m^{−2}⋅nm^{−1}. This is sometimes also confusingly called "spectral intensity".
Radiant exitance	M_{e}	watt per square metre	W/m^{2}	M⋅T^{−3}	Radiant flux emitted by a surface per unit area. This is the emitted component of radiosity. "Radiant emittance" is an old term for this quantity. This is sometimes also confusingly called "intensity".
Spectral exitance	M_{e,ν}	watt per square metre per hertz	W⋅m^{−2}⋅Hz^{−1}	M⋅T^{−2}	Radiant exitance of a surface per unit frequency or wavelength. The latter is commonly measured in W⋅m^{−2}⋅nm^{−1}. "Spectral emittance" is an old term for this quantity. This is sometimes also confusingly called "spectral intensity".
Spectral exitance	M_{e,λ}	watt per square metre, per metre	W/m^{3}	M⋅L^{−1}⋅T^{−3}	Radiant exitance of a surface per unit frequency or wavelength. The latter is commonly measured in W⋅m^{−2}⋅nm^{−1}. "Spectral emittance" is an old term for this quantity. This is sometimes also confusingly called "spectral intensity".
Radiant exposure	H_{e}	joule per square metre	J/m^{2}	M⋅T^{−2}	Radiant energy received by a surface per unit area, or equivalently irradiance of a surface integrated over time of irradiation. This is sometimes also called "radiant fluence".
Spectral exposure	H_{e,ν}	joule per square metre per hertz	J⋅m^{−2}⋅Hz^{−1}	M⋅T^{−1}	Radiant exposure of a surface per unit frequency or wavelength. The latter is commonly measured in J⋅m^{−2}⋅nm^{−1}. This is sometimes also called "spectral fluence".
Spectral exposure	H_{e,λ}	joule per square metre, per metre	J/m^{3}	M⋅L^{−1}⋅T^{−2}	Radiant exposure of a surface per unit frequency or wavelength. The latter is commonly measured in J⋅m^{−2}⋅nm^{−1}. This is sometimes also called "spectral fluence".
See also: SI; Radiometry; Photometry

== See also ==
- Luminous energy
- Luminescence
- Power
- Radiometry
- Federal Standard 1037C
- Signal transmission
- Open system
- Photoelectric effect
- Photodetector
- Solar cell

== Notes and references ==
- Lang, Kenneth R. (1999). Astrophysical Formulae. Berlin: Springer. ISBN 978-3-540-29692-8.
- Mischler, Georg (2003). "Radiant energy". Lighting Design Knowledgebase.
- Elion, Glenn R. (1979). Electro-Optics Handbook. CRC Press Technology & Industrial Arts. ISBN 0-8247-6879-5.
