= Radiometry =

Measurement of electromagnetic radiation (esp. optical radiation)

Comparison of photometric and radiometric quantities

Radiometry is a set of techniques for measuring electromagnetic radiation, including visible light. It is distinct from quantum techniques such as photon counting.

Radiometric techniques in optics characterize the distribution of the radiation's power in space, as opposed to photometric techniques, which characterize the light's interaction with the human eye. Aside from this, the fundamental difference between the two is that radiometry can cover the entire optical spectrum and by some definitions other portions of the electromagnetic radiation spectrum as well, while photometry is limited to the visible spectrum. Photometry can therefore be considered a kind of radiometry, but, defined more narrowly, its measurements accord with the spectral sensitivity of the human visual system, weighing associated quantities by wavelength.

The use of radiometers to determine the temperature of objects and gasses by measuring radiation flux is called pyrometry. Handheld pyrometer devices are often marketed as infrared thermometers.

Radiometry is important in astronomy, especially radio astronomy, and plays a significant role in Earth remote sensing. In some astronomical applications, the measurement techniques categorized as radiometry in optics are called photometry.

Spectroradiometry is the measurement of absolute radiometric quantities in narrow bands of wavelength.

== Radiometric quantities ==
SI radiometry units
Quantity		Unit		Dimension	Notes
Name	Symbol (Note: Standards organizations recommend that radiometric quantities should be denoted with suffix "e" (for "energetic") to avoid confusion with photometric or photon quantities.)	Name	Symbol	Dimension	Notes
Radiant energy	Q_{e} (Note: Alternative symbols sometimes seen: W or E for radiant energy, P or F for radiant flux, I for irradiance, W for radiant exitance.)	joule	J	M⋅L^{2}⋅T^{−2}	Energy of electromagnetic radiation.
Radiant energy density	w_{e}	joule per cubic metre	J/m^{3}	M⋅L^{−1}⋅T^{−2}	Radiant energy per unit volume.
Radiant flux	Φ_{e}	watt	W = J/s	M⋅L^{2}⋅T^{−3}	Radiant energy emitted, reflected, transmitted or received, per unit time. This is sometimes also called "radiant power", and called luminosity in astronomy.
Spectral flux	Φ_{e,ν} (Note: Spectral quantities given per unit frequency are denoted with suffix "ν" (Greek letter nu, not to be confused with a letter "v", indicating a photometric quantity.))	watt per hertz	W/Hz	M⋅L^{2}⋅T^{−2}	Radiant flux per unit frequency or wavelength. The latter is commonly measured in W⋅nm^{−1}.
Spectral flux	Φ_{e,λ} (Note: Spectral quantities given per unit wavelength are denoted with suffix "λ".)	watt per metre	W/m	M⋅L⋅T^{−3}	Radiant flux per unit frequency or wavelength. The latter is commonly measured in W⋅nm^{−1}.
Radiant intensity	I_{e,Ω} (Note: Directional quantities are denoted with suffix "Ω".)	watt per steradian	W/sr	M⋅L^{2}⋅T^{−3}	Radiant flux emitted, reflected, transmitted or received, per unit solid angle. This is a directional quantity.
Spectral intensity	I_{e,Ω,ν}	watt per steradian per hertz	W⋅sr^{−1}⋅Hz^{−1}	M⋅L^{2}⋅T^{−2}	Radiant intensity per unit frequency or wavelength. The latter is commonly measured in W⋅sr^{−1}⋅nm^{−1}. This is a directional quantity.
Spectral intensity	I_{e,Ω,λ}	watt per steradian per metre	W⋅sr^{−1}⋅m^{−1}	M⋅L⋅T^{−3}	Radiant intensity per unit frequency or wavelength. The latter is commonly measured in W⋅sr^{−1}⋅nm^{−1}. This is a directional quantity.
Radiance	L_{e,Ω}	watt per steradian per square metre	W⋅sr^{−1}⋅m^{−2}	M⋅T^{−3}	Radiant flux emitted, reflected, transmitted or received by a surface, per unit solid angle per unit projected area. This is a directional quantity. This is sometimes also called "intensity".
Spectral radiance Specific intensity	L_{e,Ω,ν}	watt per steradian per square metre per hertz	W⋅sr^{−1}⋅m^{−2}⋅Hz^{−1}	M⋅T^{−2}	Radiance of a surface per unit frequency or wavelength. The latter is commonly measured in W⋅sr^{−1}⋅m^{−2}⋅nm^{−1}. This is a directional quantity. This is sometimes also called "spectral intensity".
Spectral radiance Specific intensity	L_{e,Ω,λ}	watt per steradian per square metre, per metre	W⋅sr^{−1}⋅m^{−3}	M⋅L^{−1}⋅T^{−3}	Radiance of a surface per unit frequency or wavelength. The latter is commonly measured in W⋅sr^{−1}⋅m^{−2}⋅nm^{−1}. This is a directional quantity. This is sometimes also called "spectral intensity".
Irradiance Flux density	E_{e}	watt per square metre	W/m^{2}	M⋅T^{−3}	Radiant flux received by a surface per unit area. This is sometimes also called "intensity".
Spectral irradiance Spectral flux density	E_{e,ν}	watt per square metre per hertz	W⋅m^{−2}⋅Hz^{−1}	M⋅T^{−2}	Irradiance of a surface per unit frequency or wavelength. This is sometimes also called "spectral intensity". Non-SI units of spectral flux density include jansky (1 Jy = 10^{−26} W⋅m^{−2}⋅Hz^{−1}) and solar flux unit (1 sfu = 10^{−22} W⋅m^{−2}⋅Hz^{−1} = 10^{4} Jy).
Spectral irradiance Spectral flux density	E_{e,λ}	watt per square metre, per metre	W/m^{3}	M⋅L^{−1}⋅T^{−3}	Irradiance of a surface per unit frequency or wavelength. This is sometimes also called "spectral intensity". Non-SI units of spectral flux density include jansky (1 Jy = 10^{−26} W⋅m^{−2}⋅Hz^{−1}) and solar flux unit (1 sfu = 10^{−22} W⋅m^{−2}⋅Hz^{−1} = 10^{4} Jy).
Radiosity	J_{e}	watt per square metre	W/m^{2}	M⋅T^{−3}	Radiant flux leaving (emitted, reflected and transmitted by) a surface per unit area. This is sometimes also called "intensity".
Spectral radiosity	J_{e,ν}	watt per square metre per hertz	W⋅m^{−2}⋅Hz^{−1}	M⋅T^{−2}	Radiosity of a surface per unit frequency or wavelength. The latter is commonly measured in W⋅m^{−2}⋅nm^{−1}. This is sometimes also called "spectral intensity".
Spectral radiosity	J_{e,λ}	watt per square metre, per metre	W/m^{3}	M⋅L^{−1}⋅T^{−3}	Radiosity of a surface per unit frequency or wavelength. The latter is commonly measured in W⋅m^{−2}⋅nm^{−1}. This is sometimes also called "spectral intensity".
Radiant exitance	M_{e}	watt per square metre	W/m^{2}	M⋅T^{−3}	Radiant flux emitted by a surface per unit area. This is the emitted component of radiosity. "Radiant emittance" is an old term for this quantity. This is sometimes also called "intensity".
Spectral exitance	M_{e,ν}	watt per square metre per hertz	W⋅m^{−2}⋅Hz^{−1}	M⋅T^{−2}	Radiant exitance of a surface per unit frequency or wavelength. The latter is commonly measured in W⋅m^{−2}⋅nm^{−1}. "Spectral emittance" is an old term for this quantity. This is sometimes also called "spectral intensity".
Spectral exitance	M_{e,λ}	watt per square metre, per metre	W/m^{3}	M⋅L^{−1}⋅T^{−3}	Radiant exitance of a surface per unit frequency or wavelength. The latter is commonly measured in W⋅m^{−2}⋅nm^{−1}. "Spectral emittance" is an old term for this quantity. This is sometimes also called "spectral intensity".
Radiant exposure	H_{e}	joule per square metre	J/m^{2}	M⋅T^{−2}	Radiant energy received by a surface per unit area, or equivalently irradiance of a surface integrated over time of irradiation. This is sometimes also called "radiant fluence".
Spectral exposure	H_{e,ν}	joule per square metre per hertz	J⋅m^{−2}⋅Hz^{−1}	M⋅T^{−1}	Radiant exposure of a surface per unit frequency or wavelength. The latter is commonly measured in J⋅m^{−2}⋅nm^{−1}. This is sometimes also called "spectral fluence".
Spectral exposure	H_{e,λ}	joule per square metre, per metre	J/m^{3}	M⋅L^{−1}⋅T^{−2}	Radiant exposure of a surface per unit frequency or wavelength. The latter is commonly measured in J⋅m^{−2}⋅nm^{−1}. This is sometimes also called "spectral fluence".
See also: SI; Radiometry; Photometry

Radiometry coefficients
Quantity		SI units	Notes
Name	Sym.	SI units	Notes
Hemispherical emissivity	ε	—N/a	Radiant exitance of a surface, divided by that of a black body at the same temperature as that surface.
Spectral hemispherical emissivity	ε_{ν} ε_{λ}	—N/a	Spectral exitance of a surface, divided by that of a black body at the same temperature as that surface.
Directional emissivity	ε_{Ω}	—N/a	Radiance emitted by a surface, divided by that emitted by a black body at the same temperature as that surface.
Spectral directional emissivity	ε_{Ω,ν} ε_{Ω,λ}	—N/a	Spectral radiance emitted by a surface, divided by that of a black body at the same temperature as that surface.
Hemispherical absorptance	A	—N/a	Radiant flux absorbed by a surface, divided by that received by that surface. This should not be confused with "absorbance".
Spectral hemispherical absorptance	A_{ν} A_{λ}	—N/a	Spectral flux absorbed by a surface, divided by that received by that surface. This should not be confused with "spectral absorbance".
Directional absorptance	A_{Ω}	—N/a	Radiance absorbed by a surface, divided by the radiance incident onto that surface. This should not be confused with "absorbance".
Spectral directional absorptance	A_{Ω,ν} A_{Ω,λ}	—N/a	Spectral radiance absorbed by a surface, divided by the spectral radiance incident onto that surface. This should not be confused with "spectral absorbance".
Hemispherical reflectance	R	—N/a	Radiant flux reflected by a surface, divided by that received by that surface.
Spectral hemispherical reflectance	R_{ν} R_{λ}	—N/a	Spectral flux reflected by a surface, divided by that received by that surface.
Directional reflectance	R_{Ω}	—N/a	Radiance reflected by a surface, divided by that received by that surface.
Spectral directional reflectance	R_{Ω,ν} R_{Ω,λ}	—N/a	Spectral radiance reflected by a surface, divided by that received by that surface.
Hemispherical transmittance	T	—N/a	Radiant flux transmitted by a surface, divided by that received by that surface.
Spectral hemispherical transmittance	T_{ν} T_{λ}	—N/a	Spectral flux transmitted by a surface, divided by that received by that surface.
Directional transmittance	T_{Ω}	—N/a	Radiance transmitted by a surface, divided by that received by that surface.
Spectral directional transmittance	T_{Ω,ν} T_{Ω,λ}	—N/a	Spectral radiance transmitted by a surface, divided by that received by that surface.
Hemispherical attenuation coefficient	μ	m^{−1}	Radiant flux absorbed and scattered by a volume per unit length, divided by that received by that volume.
Spectral hemispherical attenuation coefficient	μ_{ν} μ_{λ}	m^{−1}	Spectral radiant flux absorbed and scattered by a volume per unit length, divided by that received by that volume.
Directional attenuation coefficient	μ_{Ω}	m^{−1}	Radiance absorbed and scattered by a volume per unit length, divided by that received by that volume.
Spectral directional attenuation coefficient	μ_{Ω,ν} μ_{Ω,λ}	m^{−1}	Spectral radiance absorbed and scattered by a volume per unit length, divided by that received by that volume.

== Integral and spectral radiometric quantities ==
Integral quantities (like radiant flux) describe the total effect of radiation of all wavelengths or frequencies, while spectral quantities (like spectral power) describe the effect of radiation of a single wavelength λ or frequency ν. To each integral quantity there are corresponding spectral quantities, defined as the quotient of the integrated quantity by the range of frequency or wavelength considered. For example, the radiant flux Φ_{e} corresponds to the spectral power Φ_{e,λ} and Φ_{e,ν}.

Getting an integral quantity's spectral counterpart requires a limit transition. This comes from the idea that the precisely requested wavelength photon existence probability is zero. Let us show the relation between them using the radiant flux as an example:

Integral flux, whose unit is W:
$$\Phi_\mathrm{e}.$$
Spectral flux by wavelength, whose unit is W/m:
$$\Phi_{\mathrm{e},\lambda} = {d\Phi_\mathrm{e} \over d\lambda},$$
where $d\Phi_\mathrm{e}$ is the radiant flux of the radiation in a small wavelength interval $[\lambda - {d\lambda \over 2}, \lambda + {d\lambda \over 2}]$. The area under a plot with wavelength horizontal axis equals to the total radiant flux.

Spectral flux by frequency, whose unit is W/Hz:
$$\Phi_{\mathrm{e},\nu} = {d\Phi_\mathrm{e} \over d\nu},$$
where $d\Phi_\mathrm{e}$ is the radiant flux of the radiation in a small frequency interval $[\nu - {d\nu \over 2}, \nu + {d\nu \over 2}]$. The area under a plot with frequency horizontal axis equals to the total radiant flux.

The spectral quantities by wavelength λ and frequency ν are related to each other, since the product of the two variables is the speed of light ($\lambda \cdot \nu = c$):

$\Phi_{\mathrm{e},\lambda} = {c \over \lambda^2} \Phi_{\mathrm{e},\nu},$ or $\Phi_{\mathrm{e},\nu} = {c \over \nu^2} \Phi_{\mathrm{e},\lambda},$ or $\lambda \Phi_{\mathrm{e},\lambda} = \nu \Phi_{\mathrm{e},\nu}.$

The integral quantity can be obtained by the spectral quantity's integration:

$$\Phi_\mathrm{e} =
\int_0^\infty \Phi_{\mathrm{e},\lambda}\, d\lambda =
\int_0^\infty \Phi_{\mathrm{e},\nu}\, d\nu =
\int_0^\infty \lambda \Phi_{\mathrm{e},\lambda}\, d \ln \lambda =
\int_0^\infty \nu \Phi_{\mathrm{e},\nu}\, d \ln \nu.$$

== See also ==
- Reflectivity
- Microwave radiometer
- Measurement of ionizing radiation
- Radiometric calibration
- Radiometric resolution
