= Irradiance =

Measure of radiant energy over surface area

In radiometry, irradiance is the radiant flux received by a surface per unit area. The SI unit of irradiance is the watt per square metre (symbol W⋅m^{−2} or W/m^{2}). The CGS unit erg per square centimetre per second (erg⋅cm^{−2}⋅s^{−1}) is often used in astronomy. Irradiance is often called intensity, but this term is avoided in radiometry where such usage leads to confusion with radiant intensity. In astrophysics, irradiance is called radiant flux.

Spectral irradiance is the irradiance of a surface per unit frequency or wavelength, depending on whether the spectrum is taken as a function of frequency or of wavelength. The two forms have different dimensions and units: spectral irradiance of a frequency spectrum is measured in watts per square metre per hertz (W⋅m^{−2}⋅Hz^{−1}), while spectral irradiance of a wavelength spectrum is measured in watts per square metre per metre (W⋅m^{−3}), or more commonly watts per square metre per nanometre (W⋅m^{−2}⋅nm^{−1}).

== Mathematical definitions ==
Comparison of photometric and radiometric quantities

=== Irradiance ===
Irradiance of a surface, denoted E_{e} ("e" for "energetic", to avoid confusion with photometric quantities), is defined as

$$E_\mathrm{e} = \frac{\partial \Phi_\mathrm{e}}{\partial A},$$

where

- ∂ is the partial derivative symbol;
- Φ_{e} is the radiant flux received;
- A is the area.

The radiant flux emitted by a surface is called radiant exitance.

=== Spectral irradiance ===
Spectral irradiance in frequency of a surface, denoted E_{e,ν}, is defined as

$$E_{\mathrm{e},\nu} = \frac{\partial E_\mathrm{e}}{\partial \nu},$$

where ν is the frequency.

Spectral irradiance in wavelength of a surface, denoted E_{e,λ}, is defined as

$$E_{\mathrm{e},\lambda} = \frac{\partial E_\mathrm{e}}{\partial \lambda},$$

where λ is the wavelength.

== Property ==
Irradiance of a surface is also, according to the definition of radiant flux, equal to the time-average of the component of the Poynting vector perpendicular to the surface:

$$E_\mathrm{e} = \langle|\mathbf{S}|\rangle \cos \alpha,$$

where

- ⟨ • ⟩ is the time-average;
- S is the Poynting vector;
- α is the angle between a unit vector normal to the surface and S.

For a propagating sinusoidal linearly polarized electromagnetic plane wave, the Poynting vector always points to the direction of propagation while oscillating in magnitude. The irradiance of a surface is then given by

$$E_\mathrm{e} = \frac{n}{2 \mu_0 c} E_\mathrm{m}^2 \cos \alpha
= \frac{n \varepsilon_0 c}{2} E_\mathrm{m}^2 \cos \alpha =
\frac{n }{2Z_0} E_\mathrm{m}^2 \cos \alpha,$$

where

- E_{m} is the amplitude of the wave's electric field;
- n is the refractive index of the medium of propagation;
- c is the speed of light in vacuum;
- μ_{0} is the vacuum permeability;
- ε_{0} is the vacuum permittivity;
  - $c={\frac {1}{\sqrt {\varepsilon_0 \mu_0 }}}$
  - $Z_0=\mu_0c$ is the impedance of free space.

This formula assumes that the magnetic susceptibility is negligible; i.e. that μ_{r} ≈ 1 (μ ≈ μ_{0}) where μ_{r} is the relative magnetic permeability of the propagation medium. This assumption is typically valid in transparent media in the optical frequency range.

== Point source ==
A point source of light produces spherical wavefronts. The irradiance in this case varies inversely with the square of the distance from the source.

$$E = \frac P A = \frac P {4 \pi r^2},$$

where

- r is the distance;
- P is the radiant flux;
- A is the surface area of a sphere of radius r.

For quick approximations, this equation indicates that doubling the distance reduces irradiation to one quarter; or similarly, to double irradiation, reduce the distance to 71%.

In astronomy, stars are routinely treated as point sources even though they are much larger than the Earth. This is a good approximation because the distance from even a nearby star to the Earth is much larger than the star's diameter. For instance, the irradiance of Alpha Centauri A (radiant flux: 1.5 L_{☉}, distance: 4.34 ly) is about 2.7 × 10^{−8} W/m^{2} on Earth.

== Solar irradiance ==
The global irradiance on a horizontal surface on Earth consists of the direct irradiance E_{e,dir} and diffuse irradiance E_{e,diff}. On a tilted plane, there is another irradiance component, E_{e,refl}, which is the component that is reflected from the ground. The average ground reflection is about 20% of the global irradiance. Hence, the irradiance E_{e} on a tilted plane consists of three components:

$$E_\mathrm{e} = E_{\mathrm{e},\mathrm{dir}} + E_{\mathrm{e},\mathrm{diff}} + E_{\mathrm{e},\mathrm{refl}}.$$

The integral of solar irradiance over a time period is called "solar exposure" or "insolation".

Average solar irradiance at the top of the Earth's atmosphere is roughly 1361 W/m^{2}, but at surface irradiance is approximately 1000 W/m^{2} on a clear day.

== SI radiometry units ==
SI radiometry units
Quantity		Unit		Dimension	Notes
Name	Symbol (Note: Standards organizations recommend that radiometric quantities should be denoted with suffix "e" (for "energetic") to avoid confusion with photometric or photon quantities.)	Name	Symbol	Dimension	Notes
Radiant energy	Q_{e} (Note: Alternative symbols sometimes seen: W or E for radiant energy, P or F for radiant flux, I for irradiance, W for radiant exitance.)	joule	J	M⋅L^{2}⋅T^{−2}	Energy of electromagnetic radiation.
Radiant energy density	w_{e}	joule per cubic metre	J/m^{3}	M⋅L^{−1}⋅T^{−2}	Radiant energy per unit volume.
Radiant flux	Φ_{e}	watt	W = J/s	M⋅L^{2}⋅T^{−3}	Radiant energy emitted, reflected, transmitted or received, per unit time. This is sometimes also called "radiant power", and called luminosity in astronomy.
Spectral flux	Φ_{e,ν} (Note: Spectral quantities given per unit frequency are denoted with suffix "ν" (Greek letter nu, not to be confused with a letter "v", indicating a photometric quantity.))	watt per hertz	W/Hz	M⋅L^{2}⋅T^{−2}	Radiant flux per unit frequency or wavelength. The latter is commonly measured in W⋅nm^{−1}.
Spectral flux	Φ_{e,λ} (Note: Spectral quantities given per unit wavelength are denoted with suffix "λ".)	watt per metre	W/m	M⋅L⋅T^{−3}	Radiant flux per unit frequency or wavelength. The latter is commonly measured in W⋅nm^{−1}.
Radiant intensity	I_{e,Ω} (Note: Directional quantities are denoted with suffix "Ω".)	watt per steradian	W/sr	M⋅L^{2}⋅T^{−3}	Radiant flux emitted, reflected, transmitted or received, per unit solid angle. This is a directional quantity.
Spectral intensity	I_{e,Ω,ν}	watt per steradian per hertz	W⋅sr^{−1}⋅Hz^{−1}	M⋅L^{2}⋅T^{−2}	Radiant intensity per unit frequency or wavelength. The latter is commonly measured in W⋅sr^{−1}⋅nm^{−1}. This is a directional quantity.
Spectral intensity	I_{e,Ω,λ}	watt per steradian per metre	W⋅sr^{−1}⋅m^{−1}	M⋅L⋅T^{−3}	Radiant intensity per unit frequency or wavelength. The latter is commonly measured in W⋅sr^{−1}⋅nm^{−1}. This is a directional quantity.
Radiance	L_{e,Ω}	watt per steradian per square metre	W⋅sr^{−1}⋅m^{−2}	M⋅T^{−3}	Radiant flux emitted, reflected, transmitted or received by a surface, per unit solid angle per unit projected area. This is a directional quantity. This is sometimes also called "intensity".
Spectral radiance Specific intensity	L_{e,Ω,ν}	watt per steradian per square metre per hertz	W⋅sr^{−1}⋅m^{−2}⋅Hz^{−1}	M⋅T^{−2}	Radiance of a surface per unit frequency or wavelength. The latter is commonly measured in W⋅sr^{−1}⋅m^{−2}⋅nm^{−1}. This is a directional quantity. This is sometimes also called "spectral intensity".
Spectral radiance Specific intensity	L_{e,Ω,λ}	watt per steradian per square metre, per metre	W⋅sr^{−1}⋅m^{−3}	M⋅L^{−1}⋅T^{−3}	Radiance of a surface per unit frequency or wavelength. The latter is commonly measured in W⋅sr^{−1}⋅m^{−2}⋅nm^{−1}. This is a directional quantity. This is sometimes also called "spectral intensity".
Irradiance Flux density	E_{e}	watt per square metre	W/m^{2}	M⋅T^{−3}	Radiant flux received by a surface per unit area. This is sometimes also called "intensity".
Spectral irradiance Spectral flux density	E_{e,ν}	watt per square metre per hertz	W⋅m^{−2}⋅Hz^{−1}	M⋅T^{−2}	Irradiance of a surface per unit frequency or wavelength. This is sometimes also called "spectral intensity". Non-SI units of spectral flux density include jansky (1 Jy = 10^{−26} W⋅m^{−2}⋅Hz^{−1}) and solar flux unit (1 sfu = 10^{−22} W⋅m^{−2}⋅Hz^{−1} = 10^{4} Jy).
Spectral irradiance Spectral flux density	E_{e,λ}	watt per square metre, per metre	W/m^{3}	M⋅L^{−1}⋅T^{−3}	Irradiance of a surface per unit frequency or wavelength. This is sometimes also called "spectral intensity". Non-SI units of spectral flux density include jansky (1 Jy = 10^{−26} W⋅m^{−2}⋅Hz^{−1}) and solar flux unit (1 sfu = 10^{−22} W⋅m^{−2}⋅Hz^{−1} = 10^{4} Jy).
Radiosity	J_{e}	watt per square metre	W/m^{2}	M⋅T^{−3}	Radiant flux leaving (emitted, reflected and transmitted by) a surface per unit area. This is sometimes also called "intensity".
Spectral radiosity	J_{e,ν}	watt per square metre per hertz	W⋅m^{−2}⋅Hz^{−1}	M⋅T^{−2}	Radiosity of a surface per unit frequency or wavelength. The latter is commonly measured in W⋅m^{−2}⋅nm^{−1}. This is sometimes also called "spectral intensity".
Spectral radiosity	J_{e,λ}	watt per square metre, per metre	W/m^{3}	M⋅L^{−1}⋅T^{−3}	Radiosity of a surface per unit frequency or wavelength. The latter is commonly measured in W⋅m^{−2}⋅nm^{−1}. This is sometimes also called "spectral intensity".
Radiant exitance	M_{e}	watt per square metre	W/m^{2}	M⋅T^{−3}	Radiant flux emitted by a surface per unit area. This is the emitted component of radiosity. "Radiant emittance" is an old term for this quantity. This is sometimes also called "intensity".
Spectral exitance	M_{e,ν}	watt per square metre per hertz	W⋅m^{−2}⋅Hz^{−1}	M⋅T^{−2}	Radiant exitance of a surface per unit frequency or wavelength. The latter is commonly measured in W⋅m^{−2}⋅nm^{−1}. "Spectral emittance" is an old term for this quantity. This is sometimes also called "spectral intensity".
Spectral exitance	M_{e,λ}	watt per square metre, per metre	W/m^{3}	M⋅L^{−1}⋅T^{−3}	Radiant exitance of a surface per unit frequency or wavelength. The latter is commonly measured in W⋅m^{−2}⋅nm^{−1}. "Spectral emittance" is an old term for this quantity. This is sometimes also called "spectral intensity".
Radiant exposure	H_{e}	joule per square metre	J/m^{2}	M⋅T^{−2}	Radiant energy received by a surface per unit area, or equivalently irradiance of a surface integrated over time of irradiation. This is sometimes also called "radiant fluence".
Spectral exposure	H_{e,ν}	joule per square metre per hertz	J⋅m^{−2}⋅Hz^{−1}	M⋅T^{−1}	Radiant exposure of a surface per unit frequency or wavelength. The latter is commonly measured in J⋅m^{−2}⋅nm^{−1}. This is sometimes also called "spectral fluence".
Spectral exposure	H_{e,λ}	joule per square metre, per metre	J/m^{3}	M⋅L^{−1}⋅T^{−2}	Radiant exposure of a surface per unit frequency or wavelength. The latter is commonly measured in J⋅m^{−2}⋅nm^{−1}. This is sometimes also called "spectral fluence".
See also: SI; Radiometry; Photometry

Comparison of photometric and radiometric quantities

== See also ==
- Albedo
- Fluence
- Illuminance
- Insolation
- Light diffusion
- PI curve (photosynthesis-irradiance curve)
- Solar azimuth angle
- Solar irradiance
- Solar noon
- Spectral flux density
- Stefan–Boltzmann law
