= Radiometric calibration =

Radiometric calibration is a general term used in science and technology for any set of calibration techniques in support of the measurement of electromagnetic radiation and atomic particle radiation. These can be for instance, in the field of radiometry or the measurement of ionising radiation radiated from a source.

== Ionising radiation ==
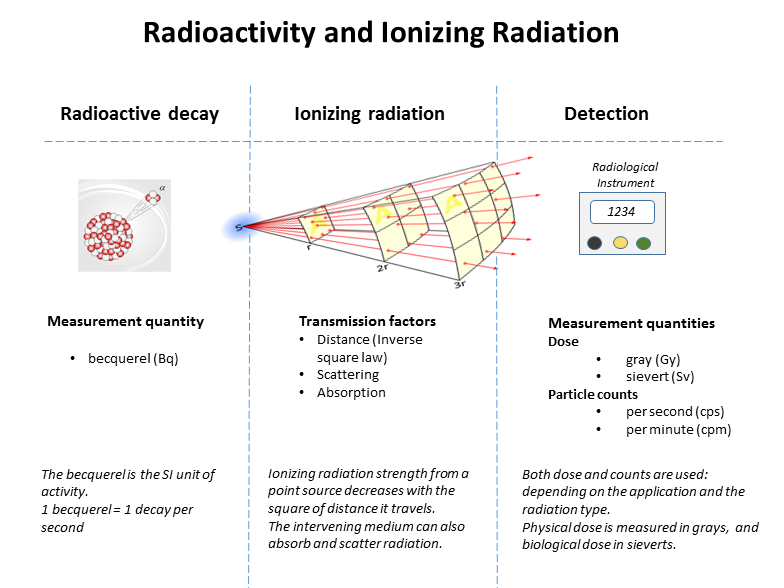
Graphic showing relationships between radioactivity and detected ionizing radiation. The detecting instrument has to be radiometrically calibrated so it is traceable to national standards.

Ionising radiation is non-visible and requires the use of ionisation detectors such as the Geiger Muller counter or ion chamber for its detection and measurement. Instruments are calibrated using standards traceable to national laboratory radiation standards, such as those at The National Physical Laboratory in the UK.

Count rate measurements are normally associated with the detection of particles, such as alpha particles and beta particles. However, for gamma ray and X-ray dose measurements a unit such as the gray or sievert is normally used.

The following table shows ionising radiation quantities in SI and non-SI units.

| Quantity | Name | Symbol | Unit | Year | System |
|---|---|---|---|---|---|
| Exposure (X) | röntgen | R | esu / 0.001293 g of air | 1928 | non-SI |
| Absorbed dose (D) | | | erg•g^{−1} | 1950 | non-SI |
| Absorbed dose (D) | rad | rad | 100 erg•g^{−1} | 1953 | non-SI |
| Absorbed dose (D) | gray | Gy | J•kg^{−1} | 1974 | SI |
| Activity (A) | curie | Ci | 3.7 × 10^{10} s^{−1} | 1953 | non-SI |
| Activity (A) | becquerel | Bq | s^{−1} | 1974 | SI |
| Dose equivalent (H) | röntgen equivalent man | rem | 100 erg•g^{−1} | 1971 | non-SI |
| Dose equivalent (H) | sievert | Sv | J•kg^{−1} | 1977 | SI |
| Fluence (Φ) | (reciprocal area) | | cm^{−2} or m^{−2} | 1962 | SI (m^{−2}) |

== Satellite sensor calibration ==
Spectral data acquired by satellite sensors are influenced by a number of factors, such as atmospheric absorption, scattering, sensor-target-illumination geometry, sensor calibration, and image data processing procedures, which tend to change through time. Targets in multi-date scenes are extremely variable and have been nearly impossible to compare in an automated mode. In order to detect genuine landscape changes as revealed by changes in surface reflectance from multi-date satellite images, it is necessary to carry out radiometric correction. Two approaches to radiometric correction are possible: absolute and relative. The absolute approach requires the use of ground measurements at the time of data acquisition for atmospheric correction and sensor calibration. This is not only costly but also impractical when archival satellite image data are used for change analysis. The relative approach to radiometric correction, known as relative radiometric normalization (RRN), is preferred because no in-situ atmospheric data at the time of satellite overpasses are required. This method involves normalizing or rectifying the intensities or digital numbers (DN) of multi-date images band-by-band to a reference image selected by the analyst. The normalized images would appear as if they were acquired with the same sensor under similar atmospheric and illumination conditions to those of the reference image.

== See also ==
- Counts per minute
- Radiometric resolution
