= Solar flux unit =

Unit of spectral flux density

solar flux unit
- Unit system: non-SI metric unit
- Unit of: spectral flux density
- Symbol: sfu

Conversions
1 sfu in ...	... is equal to ...
- SI units: 10^{−22} W⋅m^{−2}⋅Hz^{−1}
- CGS units: 10^{−19} erg⋅s^{−1}⋅cm^{−2}⋅Hz^{−1}

The solar flux unit (sfu) is a non-SI unit of spectral flux density often used in solar radio observations, such as the F10.7 solar activity index. It is equivalent to 10^{−22} watts per square metre per hertz (SI), 10^{−19} ergs per second per square centimetre per hertz (CGS), and 10^{4} Jansky.
