= Brightness =

Perception of light level

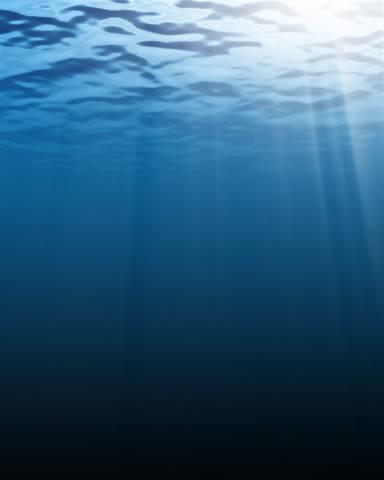
Decreasing brightness with depth (underwater photo as example)

Brightness is an attribute of visual perception in which a source appears to be radiating/reflecting light. In other words, brightness is the perception dictated by the luminance of a visual target. The perception is not linear to luminance, and relies on the context of the viewing environment (for example, see White's illusion).

Brightness is a subjective sensation of an object being observed and one of the color appearance parameters of many color appearance models, typically denoted as $Q$. Brightness refers to how much light appears to shine from something. This is a different perception than lightness, which is how light something appears compared to a similarly lit white object.

The adjective bright derives from an Old English beorht with the same meaning via metathesis giving Middle English briht. The word is from a Proto-Germanic *berhtaz, ultimately from a PIE root with a closely related meaning, *bhereg- "white, bright". "Brightness" was formerly used as a synonym for the photometric term luminance and (incorrectly) for the radiometric term radiance. As defined by the US Federal Glossary of Telecommunication Terms (FS-1037C), "brightness" should now be used only for non-quantitative references to physiological sensations and perceptions of light. Brightness is an antonym of "dimness" or "dullness".

With regard to stars, brightness is quantified as apparent magnitude and absolute magnitude.

Two pictograms resembling the Sun with rays are used to represent the settings of luminance in display devices. They have been encoded in Unicode since version 6.0 (October 2010) in the Miscellaneous Symbols and Pictographs block under U+1F505 as "low brightness symbol" (🔅) and U+1F506 as "high brightness symbol" (🔆).

The United States Federal Trade Commission (FTC) has assigned an unconventional meaning to brightness when applied to lamps: on light bulb packages, brightness means luminous flux, while in other contexts it means luminance. Luminous flux is the total amount of light coming from a source while luminance is the amount of light per unit solid angle per unit of area on the source's surface. The table below shows the standard ways of indicating the amount of light.

SI photometry quantities
Quantity		Unit		Dimension (Note: The symbols in this column denote dimensions; "L", "T" and "J" are for length, time, and luminous intensity respectively, not the symbols for the units litre, tesla, and joule.)	Notes
Name	Symbol (Note: Standards organizations recommend that photometric quantities be denoted with a subscript "v" (for "visual") to avoid confusion with radiometric or photon quantities. For example: USA Standard Letter Symbols for Illuminating Engineering USAS Z7.1-1967, Y10.18-1967)	Name	Symbol	Dimension	Notes
Luminous energy	Q_{v} (Note: Alternative symbols sometimes seen: W for luminous energy, P or F for luminous flux, and ρ for luminous efficacy of a source.)	lumen second	lm⋅s	T⋅J	The lumen second is sometimes called the talbot.
Luminous flux, luminous power	Φ_{v}	lumen (= candela steradian)	lm (= cd⋅sr)	J	Luminous energy per unit time
Luminous intensity	I_{v}	candela (= lumen per steradian)	cd (= lm/sr)	J	Luminous flux per unit solid angle
Luminance	L_{v}	candela per square metre	cd/m^{2} (= lm/(sr⋅m^{2}))	L^{−2}⋅J	Luminous flux per unit solid angle per unit projected source area. The candela per square metre is sometimes called the nit.
Illuminance	E_{v}	lux (= lumen per square metre)	lx (= lm/m^{2})	L^{−2}⋅J	Luminous flux incident on a surface
Luminous exitance, luminous emittance	M_{v}	lumen per square metre	lm/m^{2}	L^{−2}⋅J	Luminous flux emitted from a surface
Luminous exposure	H_{v}	lux second	lx⋅s	L^{−2}⋅T⋅J	Time-integrated illuminance
Luminous energy density	ω_{v}	lumen second per cubic metre	lm⋅s/m^{3}	L^{−3}⋅T⋅J	
Luminous efficacy (of radiation)	K	lumen per watt	lm/W	M^{−1}⋅L^{−2}⋅T^{3}⋅J	Ratio of luminous flux to radiant flux
Luminous efficacy (of a source)	η	lumen per watt	lm/W	M^{−1}⋅L^{−2}⋅T^{3}⋅J	Ratio of luminous flux to power consumption
Luminous efficiency, luminous coefficient	V			1	Luminous efficacy normalized by the maximum possible efficacy
See also: SI; Photometry; Radiometry

== See also ==
- Luma (video)
- Luminance (relative)
- Luminosity
