= Phot =

Measure of illuminance

- Unit system: CGS units
- Unit of: Illuminance
- Symbol: ph

Conversions
1 ph in ...	... is equal to ...
- SI derived unit: 10000 lx
- SAE units: 929 fc

A phot (ph) is a photometric unit of illuminance, or luminous flux through an area. It is not an SI unit but rather is associated with the older centimetre–gram–second system of units. The name was coined by André Blondel in 1921.

Metric equivalence:

$$1\ \mathrm{phot} = 1\ \frac{\mathrm{lumen}}{\mathrm{centimetre}^2} = 10,000\ \frac{\mathrm{lumens}}{\mathrm{metre}^2} = 10,000\ \mathrm{lux} = 10\ \mathrm{kilolux}$$

Metric dimensions:

Illuminance = luminous intensity × solid angle / length^{2}

== See also ==
- Illuminance
- Lumen (unit)
- Lux
- Photometry (optics)
- Light
