= Catasetum purum =

Scientific classification
- Kingdom: Plantae
- Clade: Tracheophytes
- Clade: Angiosperms
- Clade: Monocots
- Order: Asparagales
- Family: Orchidaceae
- Subfamily: Epidendroideae
- Genus: Catasetum
- Species: C. Purum

Binomial name
- Catasetum Purum Nees & Sinning (1824)
- The distribution of the Catasetum purum

Synonyms
- Catasetum semiapertum Hook. (1826)

Species of orchid

Catasetum purum, the one-colored catasetum, is a pseudobulbeous species of orchid found in Brazil. It is also a large sized warm sympodial epiphyte. It can grow up to 30 inches (76 cm) tall. It's flowers are unisexual and the males have a unique mechanism for pollination.

Its species epithet purum means pure in Latin referring to its one-colored flowers.

== Care ==
Catasetum purum enjoys sunlight and needs around 45000 lux and 50% shade to keep it healthy. It also endures 40-50% of humidity but grows best at 70%

== Distribution ==
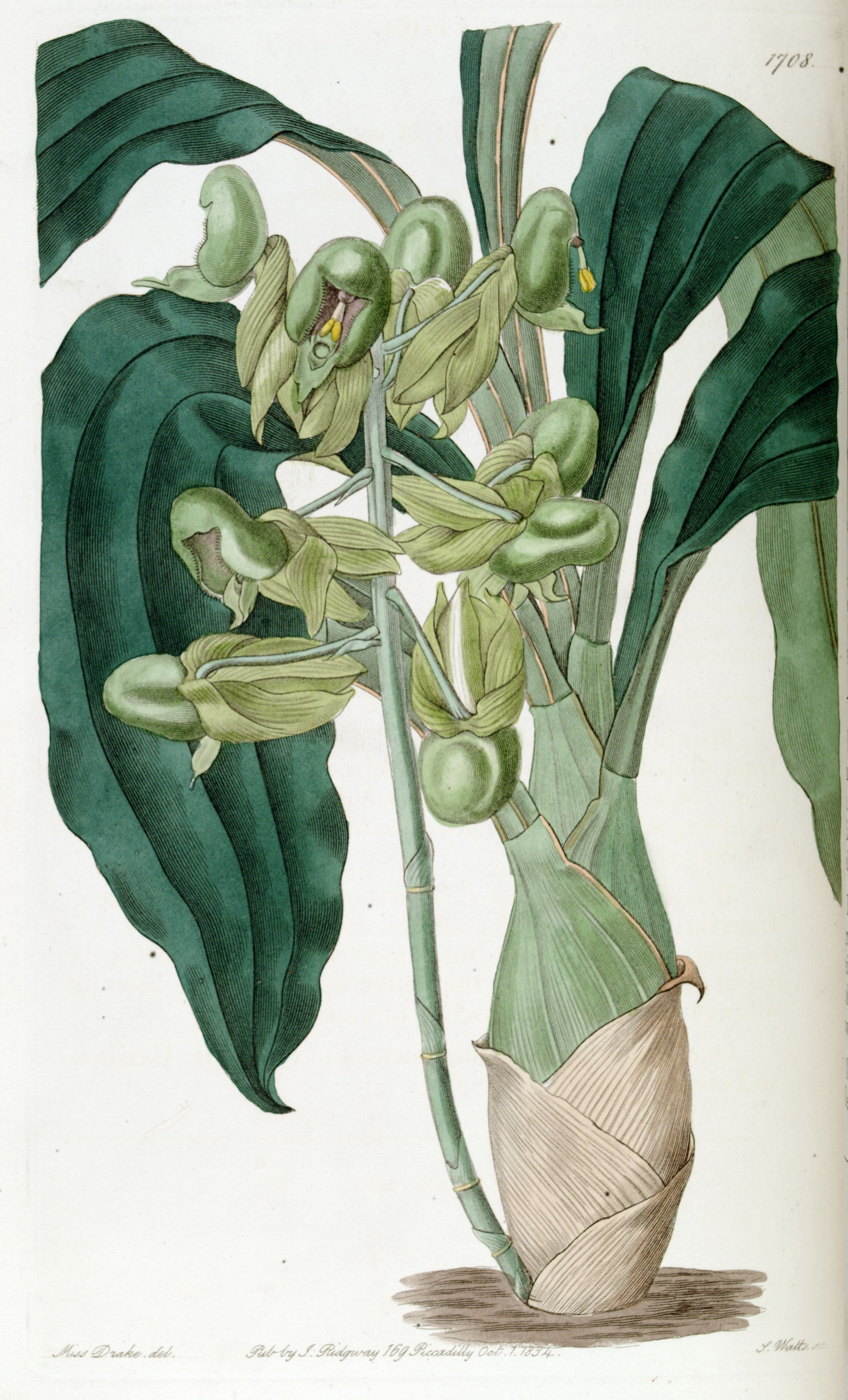
A botanical illustration as Catasetum semiapertum

The species is usually found in the states of Bahia to Espírito Santo. It usually grows on logs during the summer.
