= Wall-plug efficiency =

Energy conversion in optics

In optics, wall-plug efficiency or radiant efficiency is the energy conversion efficiency with which the system converts electrical power into radiant flux (radiant power). It is defined as the ratio of the radiant flux (i.e., the total optical output power) to the input electrical power.

For lasers, the power consumed includes losses in the power supply and the power used by the cooling system, not just the electrical power delivered to the laser itself.

== See also ==
- Coefficient of utilization
- Energy conversion efficiency
- Luminous coefficient
- Luminous efficacy - Efficacy, weighted by the eye's response to light

SI radiometry units
| Quantity | | Unit | | Dimension | Notes |
| Name | Symbol (Note: Standards organizations recommend that radiometric quantities should be denoted with suffix "e" (for "energetic") to avoid confusion with photometric or photon quantities.) | Name | Symbol | Dimension | Notes |
|---|---|---|---|---|---|
| Radiant energy | Q_{e} (Note: Alternative symbols sometimes seen: W or E for radiant energy, P or F for radiant flux, I for irradiance, W for radiant exitance.) | joule | J | M⋅L^{2}⋅T^{−2} | Energy of electromagnetic radiation. |
| Radiant energy density | w_{e} | joule per cubic metre | J/m^{3} | M⋅L^{−1}⋅T^{−2} | Radiant energy per unit volume. |
| Radiant flux | Φ_{e} | watt | W = J/s | M⋅L^{2}⋅T^{−3} | Radiant energy emitted, reflected, transmitted or received, per unit time. This is sometimes also called "radiant power", and called luminosity in astronomy. |
| Spectral flux | Φ_{e,ν} (Note: Spectral quantities given per unit frequency are denoted with suffix "ν" (Greek letter nu, not to be confused with a letter "v", indicating a photometric quantity.)) | watt per hertz | W/Hz | M⋅L^{2}⋅T^{−2} | Radiant flux per unit frequency or wavelength. The latter is commonly measured in W⋅nm^{−1}. |
| Spectral flux | Φ_{e,λ} (Note: Spectral quantities given per unit wavelength are denoted with suffix "λ".) | watt per metre | W/m | M⋅L⋅T^{−3} | Radiant flux per unit frequency or wavelength. The latter is commonly measured in W⋅nm^{−1}. |
| Radiant intensity | I_{e,Ω} (Note: Directional quantities are denoted with suffix "Ω".) | watt per steradian | W/sr | M⋅L^{2}⋅T^{−3} | Radiant flux emitted, reflected, transmitted or received, per unit solid angle. This is a directional quantity. |
| Spectral intensity | I_{e,Ω,ν} | watt per steradian per hertz | W⋅sr^{−1}⋅Hz^{−1} | M⋅L^{2}⋅T^{−2} | Radiant intensity per unit frequency or wavelength. The latter is commonly measured in W⋅sr^{−1}⋅nm^{−1}. This is a directional quantity. |
| Spectral intensity | I_{e,Ω,λ} | watt per steradian per metre | W⋅sr^{−1}⋅m^{−1} | M⋅L⋅T^{−3} | Radiant intensity per unit frequency or wavelength. The latter is commonly measured in W⋅sr^{−1}⋅nm^{−1}. This is a directional quantity. |
| Radiance | L_{e,Ω} | watt per steradian per square metre | W⋅sr^{−1}⋅m^{−2} | M⋅T^{−3} | Radiant flux emitted, reflected, transmitted or received by a surface, per unit solid angle per unit projected area. This is a directional quantity. This is sometimes also called "intensity". |
| Spectral radiance Specific intensity | L_{e,Ω,ν} | watt per steradian per square metre per hertz | W⋅sr^{−1}⋅m^{−2}⋅Hz^{−1} | M⋅T^{−2} | Radiance of a surface per unit frequency or wavelength. The latter is commonly measured in W⋅sr^{−1}⋅m^{−2}⋅nm^{−1}. This is a directional quantity. This is sometimes also called "spectral intensity". |
| Spectral radiance Specific intensity | L_{e,Ω,λ} | watt per steradian per square metre, per metre | W⋅sr^{−1}⋅m^{−3} | M⋅L^{−1}⋅T^{−3} | Radiance of a surface per unit frequency or wavelength. The latter is commonly measured in W⋅sr^{−1}⋅m^{−2}⋅nm^{−1}. This is a directional quantity. This is sometimes also called "spectral intensity". |
| Irradiance Flux density | E_{e} | watt per square metre | W/m^{2} | M⋅T^{−3} | Radiant flux received by a surface per unit area. This is sometimes also called "intensity". |
| Spectral irradiance Spectral flux density | E_{e,ν} | watt per square metre per hertz | W⋅m^{−2}⋅Hz^{−1} | M⋅T^{−2} | Irradiance of a surface per unit frequency or wavelength. This is sometimes also called "spectral intensity". Non-SI units of spectral flux density include jansky (1 Jy = 10^{−26} W⋅m^{−2}⋅Hz^{−1}) and solar flux unit (1 sfu = 10^{−22} W⋅m^{−2}⋅Hz^{−1} = 10^{4} Jy). |
| Spectral irradiance Spectral flux density | E_{e,λ} | watt per square metre, per metre | W/m^{3} | M⋅L^{−1}⋅T^{−3} | Irradiance of a surface per unit frequency or wavelength. This is sometimes also called "spectral intensity". Non-SI units of spectral flux density include jansky (1 Jy = 10^{−26} W⋅m^{−2}⋅Hz^{−1}) and solar flux unit (1 sfu = 10^{−22} W⋅m^{−2}⋅Hz^{−1} = 10^{4} Jy). |
| Radiosity | J_{e} | watt per square metre | W/m^{2} | M⋅T^{−3} | Radiant flux leaving (emitted, reflected and transmitted by) a surface per unit area. This is sometimes also called "intensity". |
| Spectral radiosity | J_{e,ν} | watt per square metre per hertz | W⋅m^{−2}⋅Hz^{−1} | M⋅T^{−2} | Radiosity of a surface per unit frequency or wavelength. The latter is commonly measured in W⋅m^{−2}⋅nm^{−1}. This is sometimes also called "spectral intensity". |
| Spectral radiosity | J_{e,λ} | watt per square metre, per metre | W/m^{3} | M⋅L^{−1}⋅T^{−3} | Radiosity of a surface per unit frequency or wavelength. The latter is commonly measured in W⋅m^{−2}⋅nm^{−1}. This is sometimes also called "spectral intensity". |
| Radiant exitance | M_{e} | watt per square metre | W/m^{2} | M⋅T^{−3} | Radiant flux emitted by a surface per unit area. This is the emitted component of radiosity. "Radiant emittance" is an old term for this quantity. This is sometimes also called "intensity". |
| Spectral exitance | M_{e,ν} | watt per square metre per hertz | W⋅m^{−2}⋅Hz^{−1} | M⋅T^{−2} | Radiant exitance of a surface per unit frequency or wavelength. The latter is commonly measured in W⋅m^{−2}⋅nm^{−1}. "Spectral emittance" is an old term for this quantity. This is sometimes also called "spectral intensity". |
| Spectral exitance | M_{e,λ} | watt per square metre, per metre | W/m^{3} | M⋅L^{−1}⋅T^{−3} | Radiant exitance of a surface per unit frequency or wavelength. The latter is commonly measured in W⋅m^{−2}⋅nm^{−1}. "Spectral emittance" is an old term for this quantity. This is sometimes also called "spectral intensity". |
| Radiant exposure | H_{e} | joule per square metre | J/m^{2} | M⋅T^{−2} | Radiant energy received by a surface per unit area, or equivalently irradiance of a surface integrated over time of irradiation. This is sometimes also called "radiant fluence". |
| Spectral exposure | H_{e,ν} | joule per square metre per hertz | J⋅m^{−2}⋅Hz^{−1} | M⋅T^{−1} | Radiant exposure of a surface per unit frequency or wavelength. The latter is commonly measured in J⋅m^{−2}⋅nm^{−1}. This is sometimes also called "spectral fluence". |
| Spectral exposure | H_{e,λ} | joule per square metre, per metre | J/m^{3} | M⋅L^{−1}⋅T^{−2} | Radiant exposure of a surface per unit frequency or wavelength. The latter is commonly measured in J⋅m^{−2}⋅nm^{−1}. This is sometimes also called "spectral fluence". |
See also: SI; Radiometry; Photometry
