= Coefficient of utilization =

Efficiency of luminaire in transferring light energy

A coefficient of utilization (CU) is a measure of the efficiency of a luminaire in transferring luminous energy to the working plane in a particular area. The CU is the ratio of luminous flux from a luminaire incident upon a work plane to that emitted by the lamps within the luminaire. As a ratio, the coefficient of utilization is unitless.

For example, some of the light emitted by a luminaire may exit away from the desired plane and is therefore wasted. A CU measures the light actually reaching the desired plane as a percentage of the total light produced by the fixture. The value for direct lighting varies from 0.2 to 0.5 while that of indirect lighting varies from 0.1 to 0.3

== See also ==
- Luminous efficacy
- Wall-plug efficiency
