= Lumen (unit) =

SI derived unit of visible light emission

lumen
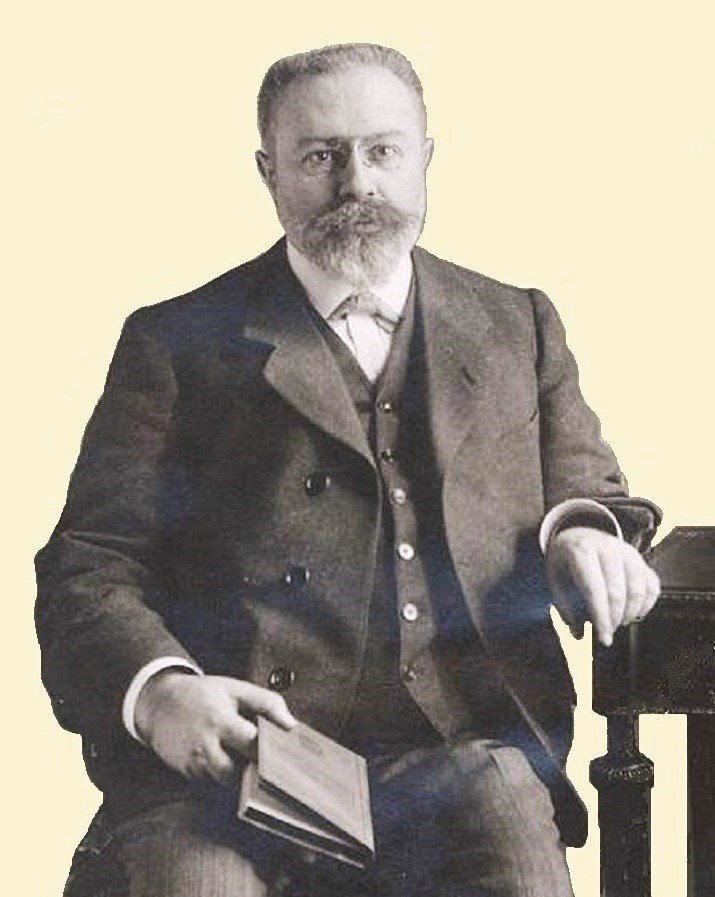
- André Blondel, creator of the lumen

General information
- Unit system: SI
- Unit of: luminous flux
- Symbol: lm

Conversions
1 lm in ...	... is equal to ...
- SI base units: cd⋅sr (Note: The 9th edition of the SI Brochure gives cd⋅sr as the lumen expressed in terms of base units, although the steradian (sr) is itself listed as a derived unit.)

The lumen (symbol: lm) is the SI unit of luminous flux, which quantifies the perceived power of visible light emitted by a source. Luminous flux differs from power (radiant flux), which encompasses all electromagnetic waves emitted, including non-visible ones such as thermal radiation (infrared). By contrast, luminous flux is weighted according to a model (a "luminosity function") of the human eye's sensitivity to various wavelengths; this weighting is standardized by the CIE and ISO.

The lumen is defined as equivalent to one candela-steradian (symbol cd·sr):

1 lm = 1 cd·sr.

A full sphere has a solid angle of 4π steradians (≈ 12.56637 sr), so an isotropic light source (that uniformly radiates in all directions) with a luminous intensity of one candela has a total luminous flux of

1 cd × 4π sr = 4π cd⋅sr = 4π lm ≈ 12.57 lm.

One lux is one lumen per square metre.

== Explanation ==
If a light source emits one candela of luminous intensity uniformly across a solid angle of one steradian, the total luminous flux emitted into that angle is one lumen (1 cd·1 sr = 1 lm). Alternatively, an isotropic one-candela light-source emits a total luminous flux of exactly 4π lumens. If the source were partly covered by an ideal absorbing hemisphere, that system would radiate half as much luminous flux—only 2π lumens. The luminous intensity would still be one candela in those directions that are not obscured.

The lumen can be thought of casually as a measure of the total amount of visible light in some defined beam or angle, or emitted from some source. The number of candelas or lumens from a source also depends on its spectrum, via the nominal response of the human eye as represented in the luminosity function.

The difference between the units lumen and lux is that the lux takes into account the area over which the luminous flux is spread. A flux of 1,000 lumens, concentrated into an area of one square metre, lights up that square metre with an illuminance of 1,000 lux. The same 1,000 lumens, spread out over ten square metres, produces a dimmer illuminance of only 100 lux. In equation form, 1 lx = 1 lm/m^{2}.

A source radiating a power of one watt of light in the color for which the eye is most efficient (a wavelength of 555 nm, in the green region of the optical spectrum) has luminous flux of 683 lumens. So a lumen represents at least 1/683 watts of visible light power, depending on the spectral distribution.

== Applications ==
=== Lighting ===
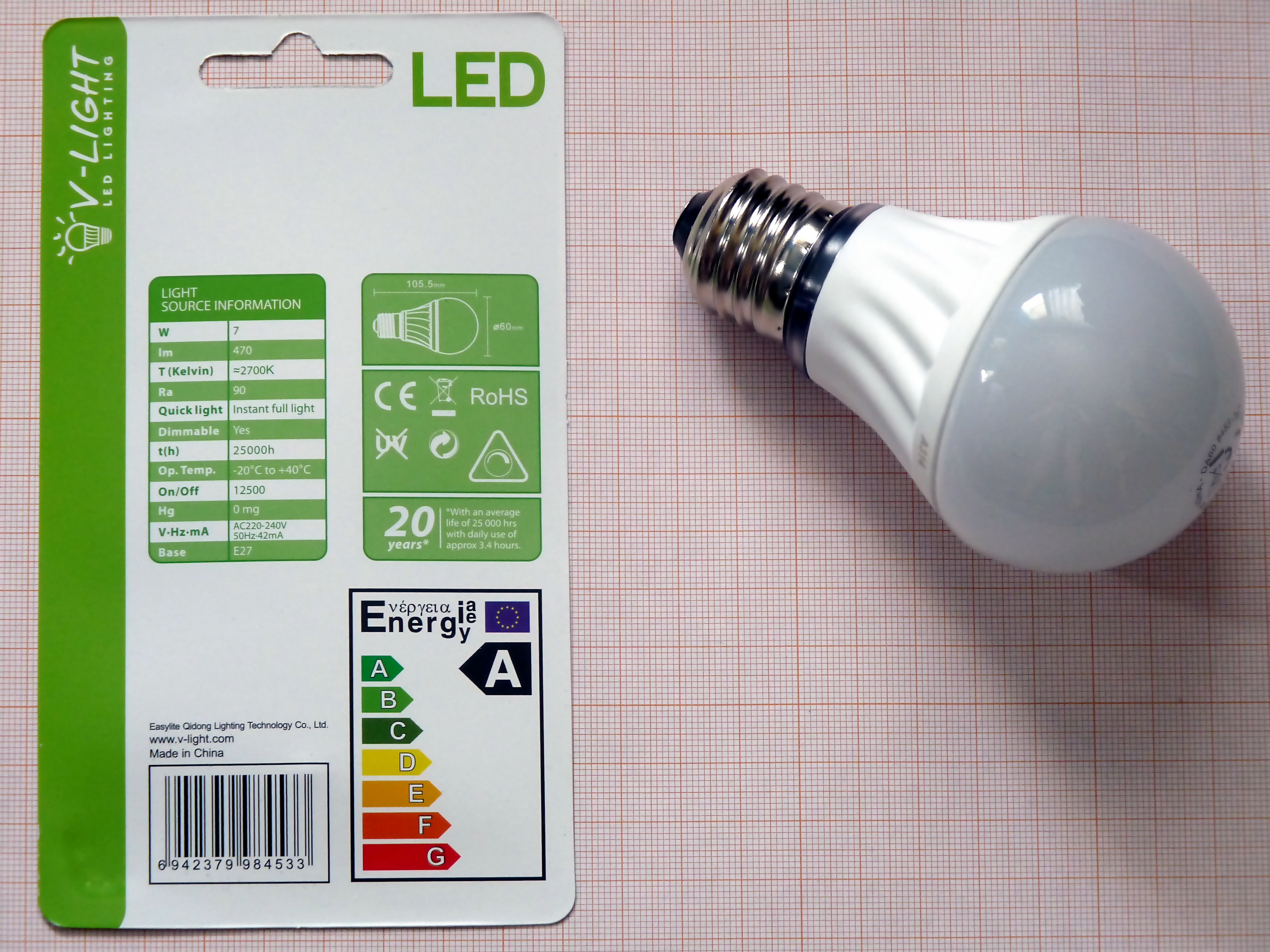
A 470-lumen LED lamp. It consumes about one sixth the electrical power of an incandescent light bulb producing the same light.

Lamps used for lighting are commonly labelled with their light output in lumens; in many jurisdictions, this is required by law.

A 23 W spiral compact fluorescent lamp emits about 1,400–1,600 lm. Many compact fluorescent lamps and other alternative light sources are labelled as being equivalent to an incandescent bulb with a specific power. Below is a table that shows typical luminous flux for common incandescent bulbs and their equivalents.

Electrical power equivalents for different lamps
Minimum light output (lumens)	Electrical power consumption (watts)			
Minimum light output (lumens)	Incandescent		Compact fluorescent	LED
Minimum light output (lumens)	Non-halogen	Halogen	Compact fluorescent	LED
90	15	6	2–3	1–2
200	25		3–5	3
450	40	29	9–11	5–8
800	60		13–15	8–12
1,100	75	53	18–20	10–16
1,600	100	72	24–28	14–17
2,400	150		30–52	24–30
3,100	200		49–75	32
4,000	300		75–100	40.5

The typical luminous efficacy of fluorescent lighting systems is 50–100 lumens per watt.

On 1 September 2010, European Union legislation came into force mandating that lighting equipment must be labelled primarily in terms of luminous flux (lm), instead of electric power (W). That change is a result of the EU's Eco-design Directive for Energy-using Products (EuP). For example, according to the European Union standard, an energy-efficient bulb that claims to be the equivalent of a 60 W tungsten bulb must have a minimum light output of 700–810 lm.

=== Projector output ===
==== ANSI lumens ====
The light output of projectors (including video projectors) is typically measured in lumens. A standardized procedure for testing projectors has been established by the American National Standards Institute, which involves averaging together several measurements taken at different positions. For marketing purposes, the luminous flux of projectors that have been tested according to this procedure may be quoted in "ANSI lumens", to distinguish them from those tested by other methods. ANSI lumen measurements are in general more accurate than the other measurement techniques used in the projector industry. This allows projectors to be more easily compared on the basis of their brightness specifications.

The method for measuring ANSI lumens is defined in the IT7.215 document which was created in 1992. First the projector is set up to display an image in a room at a temperature of 25 °C (77 °F). The brightness and contrast of the projector are adjusted so that on a full white field, it is possible to distinguish between a 5% screen area block of 95% peak white, and two identically sized 100% and 90% peak white boxes at the center of the white field. The light output is then measured on a full white field at nine specific locations around the screen and averaged. This average is then multiplied by the screen area to give the brightness of the projector in "ANSI lumens".

==== Peak lumens ====
Peak lumens is a measure of light output normally used with CRT video projectors. The testing uses a test pattern typically at either 10 and 20 percent of the image area as white at the center of the screen, the rest as black. The light output is measured just in this center area. Limitations with CRT video projectors result in them producing greater brightness when just a fraction of the image content is at peak brightness. For example, the Sony VPH-G70Q CRT video projector produces 1200 "peak" lumens but just 200 ANSI lumens.

==== Color light output ====
Brightness (white light output) measures the total amount of light projected in lumens. The color brightness specification Color Light Output measures red, green, and blue each on a nine-point grid, using the same approach as that used to measure brightness.

== History ==
The lumen was first proposed by André Blondel in 1894, along with other new measurement units for use in photometry, all based on the metre and the Violle candle.

== SI photometric units ==
SI photometry quantities
Quantity		Unit		Dimension (Note: The symbols in this column denote dimensions; "L", "T" and "J" are for length, time, and luminous intensity respectively, not the symbols for the units litre, tesla, and joule.)	Notes
Name	Symbol (Note: Standards organizations recommend that photometric quantities be denoted with a subscript "v" (for "visual") to avoid confusion with radiometric or photon quantities. For example: USA Standard Letter Symbols for Illuminating Engineering USAS Z7.1-1967, Y10.18-1967)	Name	Symbol	Dimension	Notes
Luminous energy	Q_{v} (Note: Alternative symbols sometimes seen: W for luminous energy, P or F for luminous flux, and ρ for luminous efficacy of a source.)	lumen second	lm⋅s	T⋅J	The lumen second is sometimes called the talbot.
Luminous flux, luminous power	Φ_{v}	lumen (= candela steradian)	lm (= cd⋅sr)	J	Luminous energy per unit time
Luminous intensity	I_{v}	candela (= lumen per steradian)	cd (= lm/sr)	J	Luminous flux per unit solid angle
Luminance	L_{v}	candela per square metre	cd/m^{2} (= lm/(sr⋅m^{2}))	L^{−2}⋅J	Luminous flux per unit solid angle per unit projected source area. The candela per square metre is sometimes called the nit.
Illuminance	E_{v}	lux (= lumen per square metre)	lx (= lm/m^{2})	L^{−2}⋅J	Luminous flux incident on a surface
Luminous exitance, luminous emittance	M_{v}	lumen per square metre	lm/m^{2}	L^{−2}⋅J	Luminous flux emitted from a surface
Luminous exposure	H_{v}	lux second	lx⋅s	L^{−2}⋅T⋅J	Time-integrated illuminance
Luminous energy density	ω_{v}	lumen second per cubic metre	lm⋅s/m^{3}	L^{−3}⋅T⋅J	
Luminous efficacy (of radiation)	K	lumen per watt	lm/W	M^{−1}⋅L^{−2}⋅T^{3}⋅J	Ratio of luminous flux to radiant flux
Luminous efficacy (of a source)	η	lumen per watt	lm/W	M^{−1}⋅L^{−2}⋅T^{3}⋅J	Ratio of luminous flux to power consumption
Luminous efficiency, luminous coefficient	V			1	Luminous efficacy normalized by the maximum possible efficacy
See also: SI; Photometry; Radiometry

== See also ==
- Brightness
- Foot-candle, a non-SI unit of luminous flux
- Luminous efficacy
- Nit (unit)
