= Illuminance =

Luminous flux incident on a surface per area

- Common symbols: E_{v}
- SI unit: lux
- Other units: phot, foot-candle
- In SI base units: cd·sr·m^{−2}
- Dimension: $\mathsf{L}^{-2} \mathsf{J}$

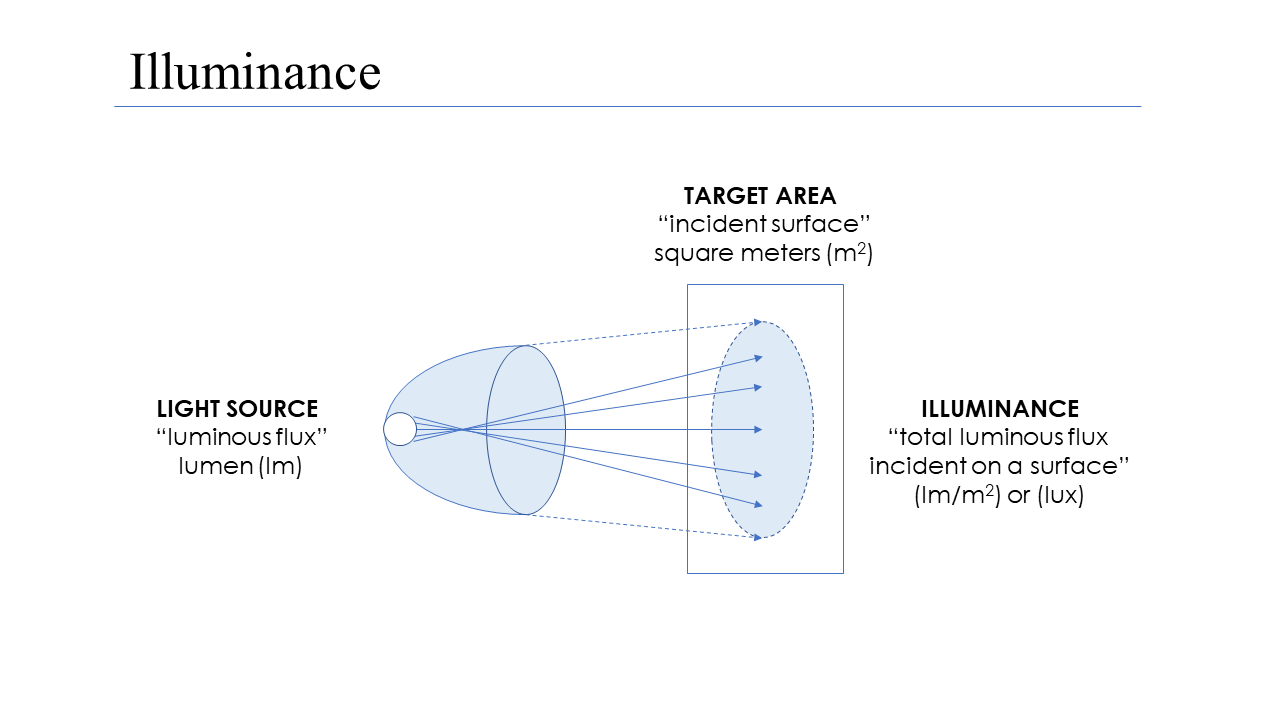
Illuminance diagram with units and terminology

In photometry, illuminance is the total luminous flux incident on a surface, per unit area. It is a measure of how much the incident light illuminates the surface, wavelength-weighted by the luminosity function to correlate with human brightness perception. Similarly, luminous emittance is the luminous flux per unit area emitted from a surface. Luminous emittance is also known as luminous exitance.

In SI units illuminance is measured in lux (lx), or equivalently in lumens per square metre (lm·m^{−2}). Luminous exitance is measured in lm·m^{−2} only, not lux. In the CGS system, the unit of illuminance is the phot, which is equal to 10000 lux. The foot-candle is a non-metric unit of illuminance that is used in photography.

Illuminance was formerly often called brightness, but this leads to confusion with other uses of the word, such as to mean luminance. "Brightness" should never be used for quantitative description, but only for nonquantitative references to physiological sensations and perceptions of light.

The human eye is capable of seeing somewhat more than a 2 trillion-fold range. The presence of white objects is somewhat discernible under starlight, at 5×10^{−5} lux (50 μlx), while at the bright end, it is possible to read large text at 10^{8} lux (100 Mlx), or about 1000 times that of direct sunlight, although this can be very uncomfortable and cause long-lasting afterimages.

== Common illuminance levels ==
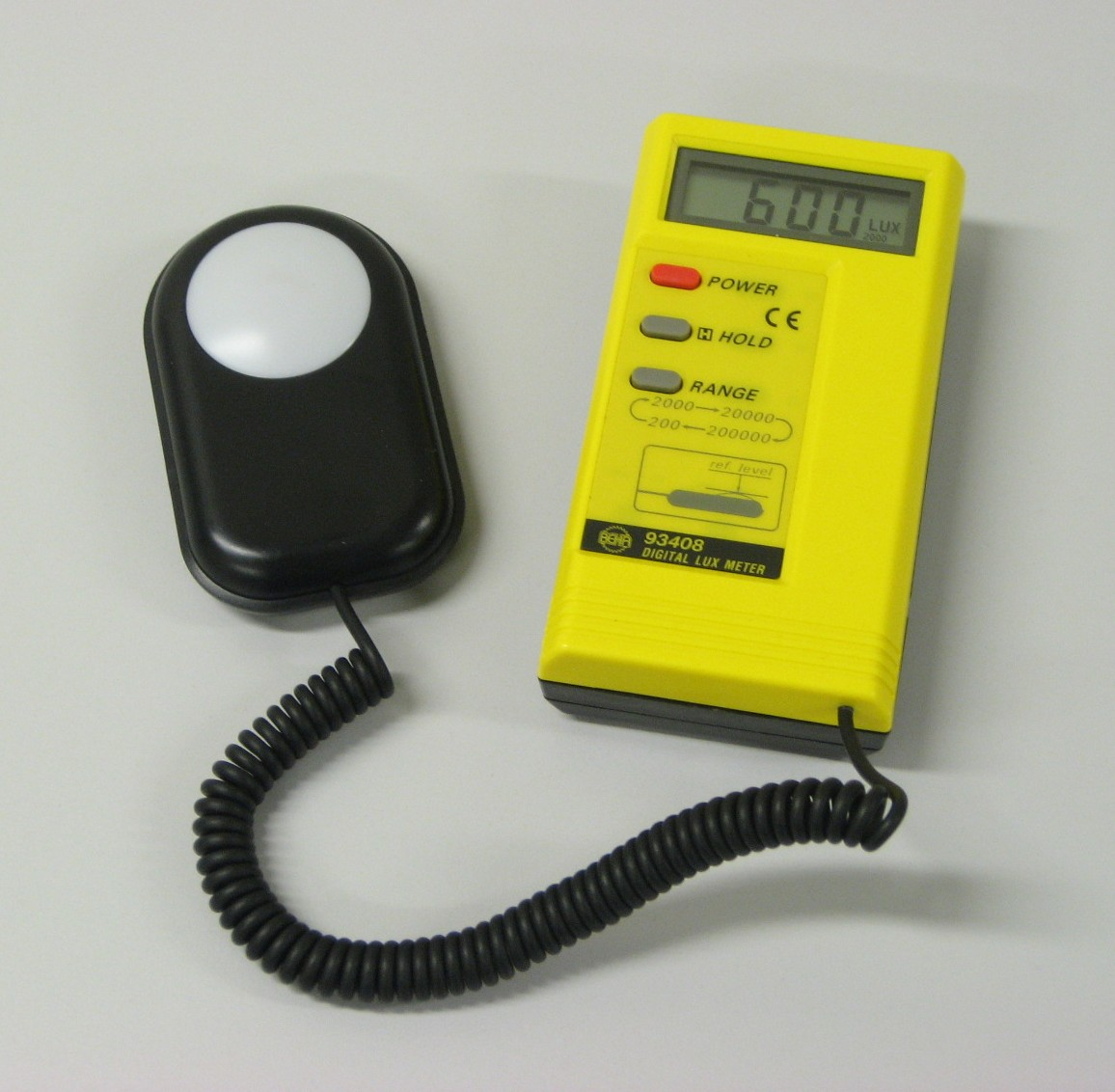
A lux meter for measuring illuminances in work environments

Lighting condition	Foot-candles	Lux
Sunlight	10,000	100,000
Shade on a sunny day	1,000	10,000
Overcast day	100	1,000
Very dark day	10	100
Twilight	1	10
Deep twilight	0.1	1
Full moon	0.01	0.1
Quarter moon	0.001	0.01
Starlight	0.0001	0.001
Overcast night	0.00001	0.0001

== Astronomy ==
In astronomy, the illuminance stars cast on the Earth's atmosphere is used as a measure of their brightness. The usual units are apparent magnitudes in the visible band. V-magnitudes can be converted to lux using the formula
$$E_\mathrm{v} = 10^{(-14.18-m_\mathrm{v})/2.5},$$
where E_{v} is the illuminance in lux, and m_{v} is the apparent magnitude. The reverse conversion is
$$m_\mathrm{v} = -14.18 - 2.5 \log(E_\mathrm{v}).$$

== Relation to luminous intensity ==
When the light source is sufficiently far away to be treated as a point source, the illuminance on a surface is related to the luminous intensity of light it receives by combining the cosine law with the inverse-square law:
$$E_\mathrm{v} = \frac{I_\mathrm{v} \cos(\theta)}{D^2}$$
where

- I_{v} is the luminous intensity of the source
- θ is the angle of incidence, and
- D is the distance between the source and the surface.

== Relation to luminance ==
Comparison of photometric and radiometric quantities

The luminance of a reflecting surface is related to the illuminance it receives:
$$\int_{\Omega_\Sigma} L_\mathrm{v} \mathrm{d}\Omega_\Sigma \cos \theta_\Sigma = M_\mathrm{v} = E_\mathrm{v} R$$
where the integral covers all the directions of emission Ω_{Σ}, and

- M_{v} is the surface's luminous exitance
- E_{v} is the received illuminance, and
- R is the reflectance.

In the case of a perfectly diffuse reflector (also called a Lambertian reflector), the luminance is isotropic, per Lambert's cosine law. Then the relationship is simply
$$L_\mathrm{v} = \frac{E_\mathrm{v} R}{\pi}$$

== See also ==
- Irradiance
- Exposure value
- Luminance

SI photometry quantities
Quantity		Unit		Dimension (Note: The symbols in this column denote dimensions; "L", "T" and "J" are for length, time and luminous intensity respectively, not the symbols for the units litre, tesla and joule.)	Notes
Name	Symbol (Note: Standards organizations recommend that photometric quantities be denoted with a subscript "v" (for "visual") to avoid confusion with radiometric or photon quantities. For example: USA Standard Letter Symbols for Illuminating Engineering USAS Z7.1-1967, Y10.18-1967)	Name	Symbol	Dimension	Notes
Luminous energy	Q_{v} (Note: Alternative symbols sometimes seen: W for luminous energy, P or F for luminous flux, and ρ for luminous efficacy of a source.)	lumen second	lm⋅s	T⋅J	The lumen second is sometimes called the talbot.
Luminous flux, luminous power	Φ_{v}	lumen (= candela steradian)	lm (= cd⋅sr)	J	Luminous energy per unit time
Luminous intensity	I_{v}	candela (= lumen per steradian)	cd (= lm/sr)	J	Luminous flux per unit solid angle
Luminance	L_{v}	candela per square metre	cd/m^{2} (= lm/(sr⋅m^{2}))	L^{−2}⋅J	Luminous flux per unit solid angle per unit projected source area. The candela per square metre is sometimes called the nit.
Illuminance	E_{v}	lux (= lumen per square metre)	lx (= lm/m^{2})	L^{−2}⋅J	Luminous flux incident on a surface
Luminous exitance, luminous emittance	M_{v}	lumen per square metre	lm/m^{2}	L^{−2}⋅J	Luminous flux emitted from a surface
Luminous exposure	H_{v}	lux second	lx⋅s	L^{−2}⋅T⋅J	Time-integrated illuminance
Luminous energy density	ω_{v}	lumen second per cubic metre	lm⋅s/m^{3}	L^{−3}⋅T⋅J	
Luminous efficacy (of radiation)	K	lumen per watt	lm/W	M^{−1}⋅L^{−2}⋅T^{3}⋅J	Ratio of luminous flux to radiant flux
Luminous efficacy (of a source)	η	lumen per watt	lm/W	M^{−1}⋅L^{−2}⋅T^{3}⋅J	Ratio of luminous flux to power consumption
Luminous efficiency, luminous coefficient	V			1	Luminous efficacy normalized by the maximum possible efficacy
See also: SI; Photometry; Radiometry
