= Luminous intensity =

Visible light per unit solid angle

luminous intensity
- Common symbols: I_{v}
- SI unit: candela
- Other units: candlepower; Hefnerkerze
- In SI base units: cd
- Dimension: $\mathsf{J}$

In photometry, luminous intensity is a measure of the wavelength-weighted power emitted by a light source in a particular direction per unit solid angle, based on the luminosity function, a standardized model of the sensitivity of the human eye. The SI unit of luminous intensity is the candela (cd), an SI base unit.

== Measurement ==
Photometry deals with the measurement of visible light as perceived by human eyes. The human eye can only see light in the visible spectrum and has different sensitivities to light of different wavelengths within the spectrum. When adapted for bright conditions (photopic vision), the eye is most sensitive to yellow-green light at 555 nm. Light with the same radiant intensity at other wavelengths has a lower luminous intensity. The curve which represents the response of the human eye to light is a defined standard function y̅(λ) or V(λ) established by the International Commission on Illumination (CIE, for Commission Internationale de l'Éclairage) and standardized in collaboration with the ISO.

Luminous intensity of artificial light sources is typically measured using a goniophotometer outfitted with a photometer or a spectroradiometer.

SI photometry quantities
Quantity		Unit		Dimension (Note: The symbols in this column denote dimensions; "L", "T" and "J" are for length, time, and luminous intensity respectively, not the symbols for the units litre, tesla, and joule.)	Notes
Name	Symbol (Note: Standards organizations recommend that photometric quantities be denoted with a subscript "v" (for "visual") to avoid confusion with radiometric or photon quantities. For example: USA Standard Letter Symbols for Illuminating Engineering USAS Z7.1-1967, Y10.18-1967)	Name	Symbol	Dimension	Notes
Luminous energy	Q_{v} (Note: Alternative symbols sometimes seen: W for luminous energy, P or F for luminous flux, and ρ for luminous efficacy of a source.)	lumen second	lm⋅s	T⋅J	The lumen second is sometimes called the talbot.
Luminous flux, luminous power	Φ_{v}	lumen (= candela steradian)	lm (= cd⋅sr)	J	Luminous energy per unit time
Luminous intensity	I_{v}	candela (= lumen per steradian)	cd (= lm/sr)	J	Luminous flux per unit solid angle
Luminance	L_{v}	candela per square metre	cd/m^{2} (= lm/(sr⋅m^{2}))	L^{−2}⋅J	Luminous flux per unit solid angle per unit projected source area. The candela per square metre is sometimes called the nit.
Illuminance	E_{v}	lux (= lumen per square metre)	lx (= lm/m^{2})	L^{−2}⋅J	Luminous flux incident on a surface
Luminous exitance, luminous emittance	M_{v}	lumen per square metre	lm/m^{2}	L^{−2}⋅J	Luminous flux emitted from a surface
Luminous exposure	H_{v}	lux second	lx⋅s	L^{−2}⋅T⋅J	Time-integrated illuminance
Luminous energy density	ω_{v}	lumen second per cubic metre	lm⋅s/m^{3}	L^{−3}⋅T⋅J	
Luminous efficacy (of radiation)	K	lumen per watt	lm/W	M^{−1}⋅L^{−2}⋅T^{3}⋅J	Ratio of luminous flux to radiant flux
Luminous efficacy (of a source)	η	lumen per watt	lm/W	M^{−1}⋅L^{−2}⋅T^{3}⋅J	Ratio of luminous flux to power consumption
Luminous efficiency, luminous coefficient	V			1	Luminous efficacy normalized by the maximum possible efficacy
See also: SI; Photometry; Radiometry

== Relationship to other measures ==
Comparison of photometric and radiometric quantities

Luminous intensity should not be confused with another photometric unit, luminous flux, which is the total perceived power emitted in all directions. Luminous intensity is the perceived power per unit solid angle. If a lamp has a 1 lumen bulb and the optics of the lamp are set up to focus the light evenly into a 1 steradian beam, then the beam would have a luminous intensity of 1 candela. If the optics were changed to concentrate the beam into 1/2 steradian then the source would have a luminous intensity of 2 candela. The resulting beam is narrower and brighter, though its luminous flux remains unchanged.

Luminous intensity is also not the same as the radiant intensity, the corresponding objective physical quantity used in the measurement science of radiometry.

== Units ==
Like other SI base units, the candela has an operational definition—it is defined by the description of a physical process that will produce one candela of luminous intensity. By definition, if one constructs a light source that emits monochromatic green light with a frequency of 540 THz, and that has a radiant intensity of (1/683) watts per steradian in a given direction, that light source will emit one candela in the specified direction.

The frequency of light used in the definition corresponds to a wavelength in a vacuum of 555 nm, which is near the peak of the eye's response to light. If the 1 candela source emitted uniformly in all directions, the total radiant flux would be about 18.40 mW, since there are 4π steradians in a sphere. A typical modern candle produces very roughly one candela while releasing heat at roughly 80 W.

Prior to the definition of the candela, a variety of units for luminous intensity were used in various countries. These were typically based on the brightness of the flame from a "standard candle" of defined composition, or the brightness of an incandescent filament of specific design. One of the best-known of these standards was the English standard: candlepower. One candlepower was the light produced by a pure spermaceti candle weighing one sixth of a pound and burning at a rate of 120 grains per hour. Germany, Austria, and Scandinavia used the Hefnerkerze, a unit based on the output of a Hefner lamp. In 1881, Jules Violle proposed the Violle as a unit of luminous intensity, and it was notable as the first unit of light intensity that did not depend on the properties of a particular lamp. All of these units were superseded by the definition of the candela.

== Usage ==
Photopic (black) and scotopic (green) luminosity functions. The photopic includes the CIE 1931 standard (solid), the Judd–Vos 1978 modified data (dashed), and the Sharpe, Stockman, Jagla & Jägle 2005 data (dotted). The horizontal axis is wavelength in nm.

The luminous intensity for monochromatic light of a particular wavelength λ is given by
$$I_\mathrm{v} = K_\text{cd} \cdot \overline{y}(\lambda) \cdot I_\mathrm{e},$$
where

- I_{v} is the luminous intensity in candelas (cd),
- I_{e} is the radiant intensity in watts per steradian (W/sr),
- K_{cd} is 683 lm/W, the luminous efficacy of 540 THz radiation defined by the SI.
- $\overline{y}(\lambda)$ is the standard luminosity function.

If more than one wavelength is present (as is usually the case), one must sum or integrate over the spectrum of wavelengths present to get the luminous intensity:
$$I_\mathrm{v} = K_\text{cd} \int_0^\infty \overline{y}(\lambda) \cdot \frac{\partial I_{\mathrm{e}}}{\partial \lambda} \, d\lambda.$$

== See also ==
- Brightness
- International System of Quantities
- Radiance

Quantity			SI unit	
Name	Symbol	Dimension symbol	Unit name	Unit symbol
time, duration	t	T	second	s
length	l, x, r, etc.	L	metre	m
mass	m	M	kilogram	kg
electric current	I , i	I	ampere	A
thermodynamic temperature	T	Θ	kelvin	K
amount of substance	n	N	mole	mol
luminous intensity	I_{v}	J	candela	cd
