= Color Light Output =

Color Light Output (CLO), also known as Color Brightness, is a specification that provides information on a projector’s ability to reproduce color. Color Light Output is specified in the lumen unit and measures a color projection system's ability to correctly reproduce color brightness.

== Objective ==
The Color Light Output specification provides projector buyers the advantage of a standard, objective metric with which to make product comparisons and selections. Projector manufacturers generally provide information about resolution, white light brightness and contrast ratio as descriptors of projector performance. However, none of these specifications directly covered a projector’s color performance. The Color Light Output metric complements existing specifications to give buyers an accurate way to evaluate competing projector models more thoroughly.

== Background ==
In 2009, the National Institute of Standards and Technology (NIST) issued a scientific paper stating that in addition to the typical white light brightness rating of display devices, there was a need for providing "an equivalent measurement that will better describe a projector's color performance when rendering full color imagery".

In 2012, the Society for Information Display (SID), a global professional organization focused on the development of the display industry, published the Color Light Output standard to provide display and projector buyers with an easy metric to evaluate color performance. The Color Light Output standard was developed after the SID conducted comprehensive research and performance evaluations and concluded that a color performance standard was scientifically valid and relevant for the display industry. Color Light Output measurement methodologies for displays, including projectors are specified in a document entitled The International Display Measurement Standard (IDMS). which was developed in collaboration with SID's affiliated organizations: the International Committee for Display Metrology (ICDM) and the Video Electronics Standards Association (VESA).
