= Luminous efficacy =

How efficiently a source produces visible light

- Common symbols: K
- SI unit: lm⋅W^{−1}
- In SI base units: cd⋅sr⋅s^{3}⋅kg^{−1}⋅m^{−2}
- Dimension: $\mathsf J \mathsf{T}^{3} \mathsf{M}^{-1} \mathsf{L}^{-2}$

In lighting, luminous efficacy is a measure of how efficiently a light source produces visible light. It is the ratio of luminous flux to power, measured in lumens per watt in the International System of Units (SI). Depending on context, the power can either be the radiant flux of the source's output, or it can be the total power (electric power, chemical energy, or others) consumed by the source. Which sense of the term is intended must usually be inferred from the context, and is sometimes unclear. The former sense is sometimes called luminous efficacy of radiation, and the latter luminous efficacy of a light source or overall luminous efficacy.

Not all wavelengths of light are equally effective at stimulating human vision, due to the spectral sensitivity of the human eye: radiation in the infrared and ultraviolet parts of the spectrum is useless for illumination. The luminous efficacy of a source is the product of its efficiency in converting energy to electromagnetic radiation, and a factor representing how well the emitted radiation is detected by the human eye.

== Efficacy and efficiency ==
Luminous efficacy can be normalized by the maximum possible luminous efficacy to a dimensionless quantity called luminous efficiency. The distinction between efficacy and efficiency is not always carefully maintained in published sources, so it is not uncommon to see "efficiencies" expressed in lumens per watt, or "efficacies" expressed as a percentage.

== Luminous efficacy of radiation ==
By definition, light outside the visible spectrum cannot be seen by the standard human vision system, and therefore does not contribute to, and indeed can subtract from, luminous efficacy.

=== Explanation ===
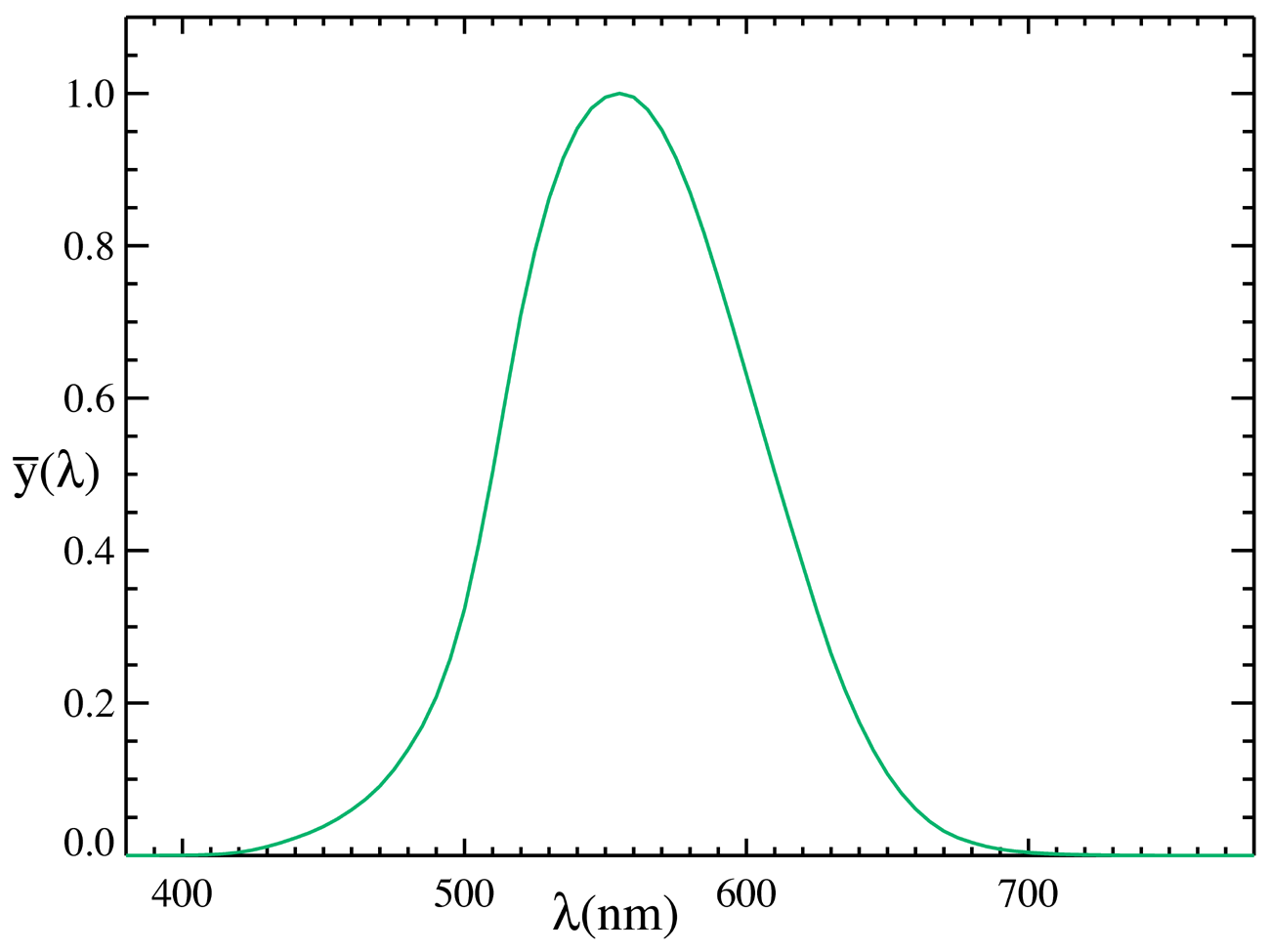
The typical response of human vision to light under daytime or bright conditions, as standardized by the CIE in 1924. The horizontal axis is wavelength in nanometers.

Luminous efficacy of radiation measures the fraction of electromagnetic power which is useful for lighting. It is obtained by dividing the luminous flux by the radiant flux. Light wavelengths outside the visible spectrum reduce luminous efficacy, because they contribute to the radiant flux, while the luminous flux of such light is zero. Wavelengths near the peak of the eye's response contribute more strongly than those near the edges.

Wavelengths of light outside of the visible spectrum are not useful for general illumination. (Note: There are special cases of illumination involving wavelengths of light that are outside the human visible range. One example is ultraviolet light which is not itself visible, but can excite some pigments to fluoresce, and thus re-emit the light within the visible range. Such special cases are not a contributing part of luminous efficacy calculations.) Furthermore, human vision responds more to some wavelengths of light than others. This response of the eye is represented by the luminous efficiency function. This is a standardized function representing photopic vision, which models the response of the eye's cone cells, which are active under typical daylight conditions. A separate curve can be defined for dark/night conditions, modeling the response of rod cells without cones, known as scotopic vision. (Mesopic vision describes the transition zone in dim conditions, between photopic and scotopic, where both cones and rods are active.)

Photopic luminous efficacy of radiation has a maximum possible value of 683.002 lm/W, for monochromatic light at a wavelength of 555 nm. (Note: Standard vision typically perceives 555 nm as a hue of yellowish-green , which can be emulated on an sRGB display with CSS color value rgb(120,255,0) or hex #78ff00.) Scotopic luminous efficacy of radiation reaches a maximum of 1700 lm/W for monochromatic light at a wavelength of 507 nm. (Note: Under standard photopic vision 507 nm is perceived as a blue-green hue similar to viridian , however scotopic rod-only vision does not create a color sensation in the standard human vision system.)

=== Mathematical definition ===
Luminous efficacy (of radiation), denoted K, is defined as

$$K = \frac{\Phi_\mathrm{v}}{\Phi_\mathrm{e}} = \frac{\int_0^\infty K(\lambda) \Phi_{\mathrm{e},\lambda}\,\mathrm{d}\lambda}{\int_0^\infty \Phi_{\mathrm{e},\lambda}\,\mathrm{d}\lambda},$$

where

- Φ_{v} is the luminous flux;
- Φ_{e} is the radiant flux;
- Φ_{e,λ} is the spectral radiant flux;
- K(λ) = K_{m}V(λ) is the spectral luminous efficacy.

=== Examples ===
==== Photopic vision ====
Type	Luminous efficacy of radiation (lm/W)	Luminous efficiency (Note: Defined such that the maximum possible luminous efficacy corresponds to a luminous efficiency of 100%.)
Tungsten light bulb, typical, 2800 K	15	2%
Class M star (Antares, Betelgeuse), 3300 K	30	4%
Black-body, 4000 K, ideal	54.7 (Note: Black body visible spectrum)	8%
Class G star (Sun, Capella), 5800 K	93	13.6%
Black-body, 7000 K, ideal	95	14%
Black-body, 5800 K, truncated to 400–700 nm (ideal "white" source) (Note: Most efficient source that mimics the solar spectrum within range of human visual sensitivity.)	251 (Note: Integral of truncated Planck function times photopic luminosity function times 683.002 lm/W.)	37%
Black-body, 5800 K, truncated to ≥ 2% photopic sensitivity range (Note: Omits the part of the spectrum where the eye's sensitivity is very poor.)	292	43%
Black-body, 2800 K, truncated to ≥ 2% photopic sensitivity range	299	44%
Black-body, 2800 K, truncated to ≥ 5% photopic sensitivity range (Note: Omits the part of the spectrum where the eye's sensitivity is low (≤ 5% of the peak).)	343	50%
Black-body, 5800 K, truncated to ≥ 5% photopic sensitivity range	348	51%
Monochromatic source at 540 THz	683 (exact)	99.9997%
Ideal monochromatic source: 555 nm (in air)	683.002	100%

==== Scotopic vision ====
Type	Luminous efficacy of radiation (lm/W)	Luminous efficiency
Ideal monochromatic 507 nm source	1699 or 1700	100%

Spectral radiance of a black body. Wavelengths outside the visible light band (~ 380–750 nm, bounded within grey dotted lines) have very low luminous efficiency.

== Lighting efficiency ==
Artificial light sources are usually evaluated in terms of luminous efficacy of the source, also sometimes called wall-plug efficacy. This is the ratio between the total luminous flux emitted by a device and the total amount of input power (electrical, etc.) it consumes. The luminous efficacy of the source is a measure of the efficiency of the device with the output adjusted to account for the spectral response curve (the luminosity function). When expressed in dimensionless form (for example, as a fraction of the maximum possible luminous efficacy), this value may be called luminous efficiency of a source, overall luminous efficiency or lighting efficiency.

The main difference between the luminous efficacy of radiation and the luminous efficacy of a source is that the latter accounts for input energy that is lost as heat or otherwise exits the source as something other than electromagnetic radiation. Luminous efficacy of radiation is a property of the radiation emitted by a source. Luminous efficacy of a source is a property of the source as a whole.

=== Examples ===
The following table lists luminous efficacy of a source and efficiency for various light sources. Note that all lamps requiring electrical/electronic ballast are unless noted (see also voltage) listed without losses for that, reducing total efficiency.

Category	Type	Overall luminous efficacy (lm/W)	Overall luminous efficiency
Combustion	Candle	0.1–0.2	0.01–0.03%
Combustion	Gas mantle	1–2	0.1–0.3%
Incandescent	15, 40, 100 W tungsten incandescent (230 V)	8.0, 10.4, 13.8	1.2, 1.5, 2.0%
Incandescent	5, 40, 100 W tungsten incandescent (120 V)	5.0, 12.6, 17.5	0.7, 1.8, 2.6%
Halogen incandescent	100, 200, 500 W tungsten halogen (230 V)	16.7, 17.6, 19.8	2.4, 2.6, 2.9%
Halogen incandescent	2.6 W tungsten halogen (5.2 V)	19.2	2.8%
Halogen incandescent	Halogen-IR (120 V)	17.7–24.5	2.6–3.5%
Halogen incandescent	Tungsten quartz halogen (12–24 V)	24	3.5%
Halogen incandescent	Photographic and projection lamps	35	5.1%
Light-emitting diode	LED screw base lamp (120 V)	102	14.9%
Light-emitting diode	5–16 W LED screw base lamp (230 V)	75–217	11–32%
Light-emitting diode	21.5 W LED retrofit for T8 fluorescent tube (230 V)	172	25%
Light-emitting diode	Theoretical limit for a white LED with phosphorescence color mixing	260–300	38.1–43.9%
Light-emitting diode	Red LED 660 nm		83%
Arc lamp	Carbon arc lamp	2–7	0.29–1.0%
Arc lamp	Xenon arc lamp	30–90	4.4–13.5%
Arc lamp	Mercury-xenon arc lamp	50–55	7.3–8%
Arc lamp	Ultra-high-pressure (UHP) mercury-vapor arc lamp, free mounted	58–78	8.5–11.4%
Arc lamp	Ultra-high-pressure (UHP) mercury-vapor arc lamp, with reflector for projectors	30–50	4.4–7.3%
Fluorescent	32 W T12 tube with magnetic ballast	60	9%
Fluorescent	9–32 W compact fluorescent (with ballast)	46–75	8–11.45%
Fluorescent	T8 tube with electronic ballast	80–100	12–15%
Fluorescent	PL-S 11 W U-tube, excluding ballast loss	82	12%
Fluorescent	T5 tube	70–104.2	10–15.63%
Fluorescent	70–150 W inductively-coupled electrodeless lighting system	71–84	10–12%
Gas discharge	1400 W sulfur lamp	100	15%
Gas discharge	Metal-halide lamp	65–115	9.5–17%
Gas discharge	High-pressure sodium lamp	85–150	12–22%
Gas discharge	Low-pressure sodium lamp	100–200	15–29%
Gas discharge	Plasma display panel	2–10	0.3–1.5%
Cathodoluminescence	Electron-stimulated luminescence	30–110	15%
Ideal sources	Truncated 5800 K black-body	251	37%
Ideal sources	Green light at 555 nm (maximum possible luminous efficacy by definition)	683.002	100%

Sources that depend on thermal emission from a solid filament, such as incandescent light bulbs, tend to have low overall efficacy because, as explained by Donald L. Klipstein, "An ideal thermal radiator produces visible light most efficiently at temperatures around 6300 °C (6600 K or 11500 °F). Even at this high temperature, a lot of the radiation is either infrared or ultraviolet, and the theoretical luminous [efficacy] is 95 lumens per watt. No substance is solid and usable as a light bulb filament at temperatures anywhere close to this. The surface of the sun is not quite that hot." At temperatures where the tungsten filament of an ordinary light bulb remains solid (below 3683 K), most of its emission is in the infrared.

== SI photometry units ==
SI photometry quantities
Quantity		Unit		Dimension (Note: The symbols in this column denote dimensions; "L", "T" and "J" are for length, time, and luminous intensity respectively, not the symbols for the units litre, tesla, and joule.)	Notes
Name	Symbol (Note: Standards organizations recommend that photometric quantities be denoted with a subscript "v" (for "visual") to avoid confusion with radiometric or photon quantities. For example: USA Standard Letter Symbols for Illuminating Engineering USAS Z7.1-1967, Y10.18-1967)	Name	Symbol	Dimension	Notes
Luminous energy	Q_{v} (Note: Alternative symbols sometimes seen: W for luminous energy, P or F for luminous flux, and ρ for luminous efficacy of a source.)	lumen second	lm⋅s	T⋅J	The lumen second is sometimes called the talbot.
Luminous flux, luminous power	Φ_{v}	lumen (= candela steradian)	lm (= cd⋅sr)	J	Luminous energy per unit time
Luminous intensity	I_{v}	candela (= lumen per steradian)	cd (= lm/sr)	J	Luminous flux per unit solid angle
Luminance	L_{v}	candela per square metre	cd/m^{2} (= lm/(sr⋅m^{2}))	L^{−2}⋅J	Luminous flux per unit solid angle per unit projected source area. The candela per square metre is sometimes called the nit.
Illuminance	E_{v}	lux (= lumen per square metre)	lx (= lm/m^{2})	L^{−2}⋅J	Luminous flux incident on a surface
Luminous exitance, luminous emittance	M_{v}	lumen per square metre	lm/m^{2}	L^{−2}⋅J	Luminous flux emitted from a surface
Luminous exposure	H_{v}	lux second	lx⋅s	L^{−2}⋅T⋅J	Time-integrated illuminance
Luminous energy density	ω_{v}	lumen second per cubic metre	lm⋅s/m^{3}	L^{−3}⋅T⋅J	
Luminous efficacy (of radiation)	K	lumen per watt	lm/W	M^{−1}⋅L^{−2}⋅T^{3}⋅J	Ratio of luminous flux to radiant flux
Luminous efficacy (of a source)	η	lumen per watt	lm/W	M^{−1}⋅L^{−2}⋅T^{3}⋅J	Ratio of luminous flux to power consumption
Luminous efficiency, luminous coefficient	V			1	Luminous efficacy normalized by the maximum possible efficacy
See also: SI; Photometry; Radiometry

== See also ==
- Photometry
- Light pollution
- Wall-plug efficiency
- Coefficient of utilization
- List of light sources
- SI defining constants, including K_{cd} (used in the definition of candela)
