= Luminous flux =

Perceived luminous power

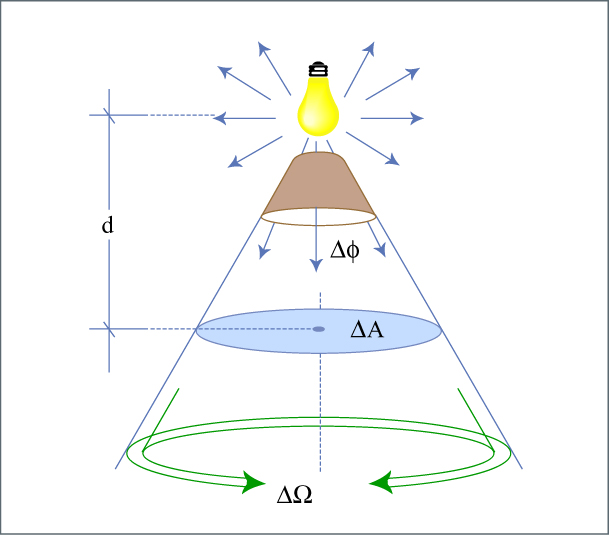
- Diagram of luminous flux emitted within a certain solid angle.
- Common symbols: Φ_{v}
- SI unit: lumen
- In SI base units: cd⋅sr
- Dimension: $\mathsf{J}$

In photometry, luminous flux or luminous power is the measure of the perceived power of light. It differs from radiant flux, the measure of the total power of electromagnetic radiation (including infrared, ultraviolet, and visible light), in that luminous flux is adjusted to reflect the varying sensitivity of the human eye to different wavelengths of light.

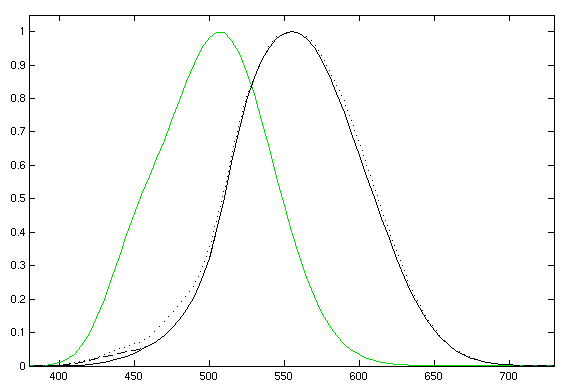
Photopic (black line) and scotopic (green line) luminosity functions. The photopic includes the CIE 1931 standard (solid), the Judd–Vos 1978 modified data (dashed), and the Sharpe, Stockman, Jagla & Jägle 2005 data (dotted). The horizontal axis is wavelength in nm.

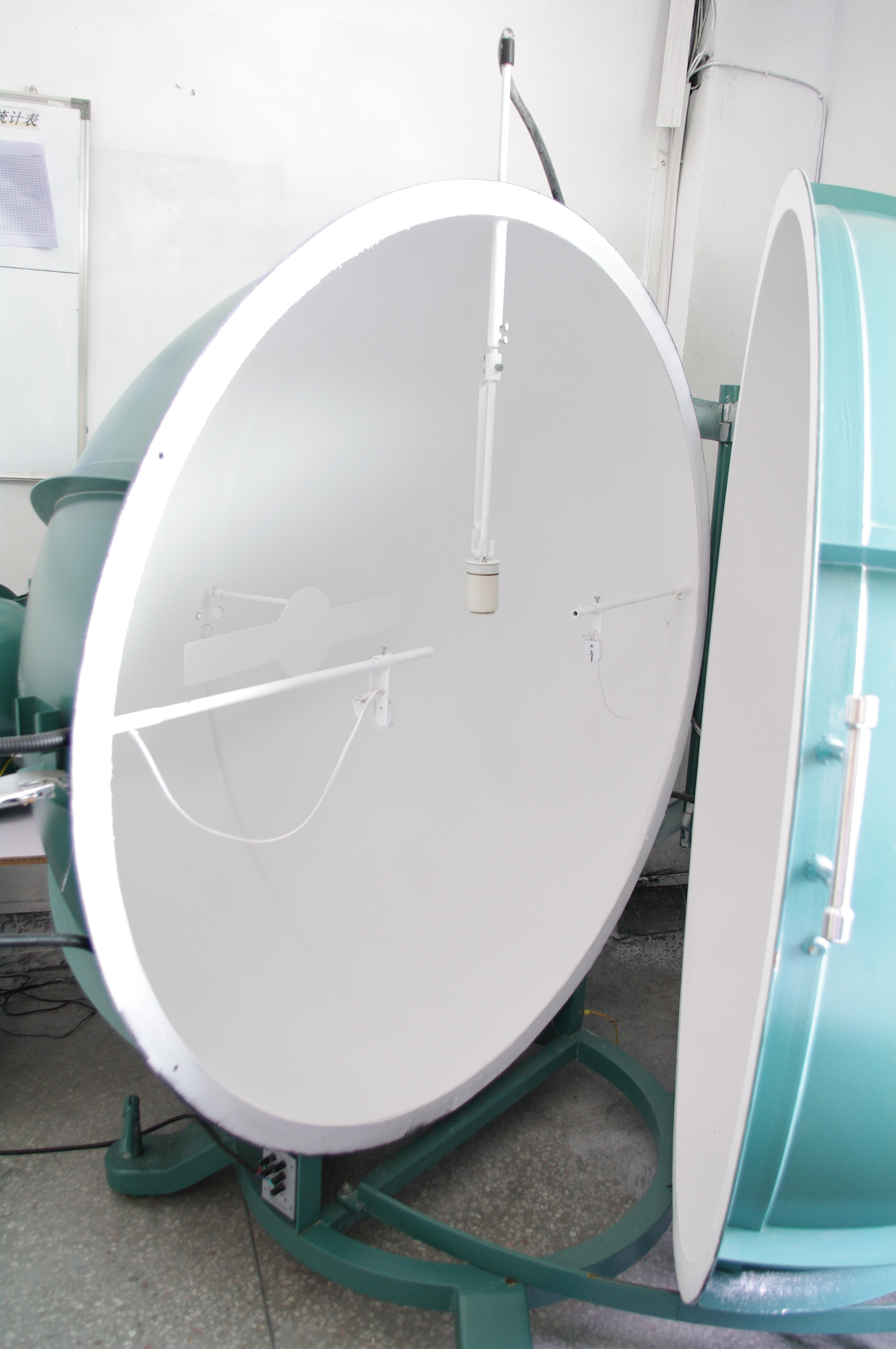
Integrating sphere used for measuring the luminous flux of a light source

== Units ==
The SI unit of luminous flux is the lumen (lm). One lumen is defined as the luminous flux of light produced by a light source that emits one candela of luminous intensity over a solid angle of one steradian.

$$1\ \text{lm} = 1\ \text{cd} \times 1\ \text{sr}$$

In other systems of units, luminous flux may have units of power.

== Weighting ==
The luminous flux accounts for the sensitivity of the eye by weighting the power at each wavelength with the luminosity function, which represents the eye's response to different wavelengths. The luminous flux is a weighted sum of the power at all wavelengths in the visible band. Light outside the visible band does not contribute. The ratio of the total luminous flux to the radiant flux is called the luminous efficacy. This model of the human visual brightness perception, is standardized by the CIE and ISO.

== Context ==
Luminous flux is often used as an objective measure of the useful light emitted by a light source, and is typically reported on the packaging for light bulbs, although it is not always prominent. Consumers commonly compare the luminous flux of different light bulbs since it provides an estimate of the apparent amount of light the bulb will produce, and a lightbulb with a higher ratio of luminous flux to consumed power is more efficient.

Luminous flux is not used to compare brightness, as this is a subjective perception which varies according to the distance from the light source and the angular spread of the light from the source.

== Measurement ==
Luminous flux of artificial light sources is typically measured using an integrating sphere, or a goniophotometer outfitted with a photometer or a spectroradiometer.

SI photometry quantities
Quantity		Unit		Dimension (Note: The symbols in this column denote dimensions; "L", "T" and "J" are for length, time, and luminous intensity respectively, not the symbols for the units litre, tesla, and joule.)	Notes
Name	Symbol (Note: Standards organizations recommend that photometric quantities be denoted with a subscript "v" (for "visual") to avoid confusion with radiometric or photon quantities. For example: USA Standard Letter Symbols for Illuminating Engineering USAS Z7.1-1967, Y10.18-1967)	Name	Symbol	Dimension	Notes
Luminous energy	Q_{v} (Note: Alternative symbols sometimes seen: W for luminous energy, P or F for luminous flux, and ρ for luminous efficacy of a source.)	lumen second	lm⋅s	T⋅J	The lumen second is sometimes called the talbot.
Luminous flux, luminous power	Φ_{v}	lumen (= candela steradian)	lm (= cd⋅sr)	J	Luminous energy per unit time
Luminous intensity	I_{v}	candela (= lumen per steradian)	cd (= lm/sr)	J	Luminous flux per unit solid angle
Luminance	L_{v}	candela per square metre	cd/m^{2} (= lm/(sr⋅m^{2}))	L^{−2}⋅J	Luminous flux per unit solid angle per unit projected source area. The candela per square metre is sometimes called the nit.
Illuminance	E_{v}	lux (= lumen per square metre)	lx (= lm/m^{2})	L^{−2}⋅J	Luminous flux incident on a surface
Luminous exitance, luminous emittance	M_{v}	lumen per square metre	lm/m^{2}	L^{−2}⋅J	Luminous flux emitted from a surface
Luminous exposure	H_{v}	lux second	lx⋅s	L^{−2}⋅T⋅J	Time-integrated illuminance
Luminous energy density	ω_{v}	lumen second per cubic metre	lm⋅s/m^{3}	L^{−3}⋅T⋅J	
Luminous efficacy (of radiation)	K	lumen per watt	lm/W	M^{−1}⋅L^{−2}⋅T^{3}⋅J	Ratio of luminous flux to radiant flux
Luminous efficacy (of a source)	η	lumen per watt	lm/W	M^{−1}⋅L^{−2}⋅T^{3}⋅J	Ratio of luminous flux to power consumption
Luminous efficiency, luminous coefficient	V			1	Luminous efficacy normalized by the maximum possible efficacy
See also: SI; Photometry; Radiometry

=== Relationship to luminous intensity ===
Comparison of photometric and radiometric quantities

Luminous flux (in lumens) is a measure of the total amount of light a lamp puts out. The luminous intensity (in candelas) is a measure of how bright the beam in a particular direction is. If a lamp has a 1 lumen bulb and the optics of the lamp are set up to focus the light evenly into a 1 steradian beam, then the beam would have a luminous intensity of 1 candela. If the optics were changed to concentrate the beam into 1/2 steradian then the source would have a luminous intensity of 2 candela. The resulting beam is narrower and brighter, however the luminous flux remains the same.

== Examples ==
Table of comparative luminous flux of several light sources
Source	Luminous flux (lumens)
37 mW "Superbright" white LED	0.20
15 mW green laser (532 nm wavelength)	8.4
1 W high-output white LED	25–120
Kerosene lantern	100
40 W incandescent lamp at 230 volts	325
7 W high-output white LED	450
6 W COB filament LED lamp	600
18 W fluorescent lamp	1250
100 W incandescent lamp	1750
40 W fluorescent lamp	2800
35 W xenon bulb	2200–3200
100 W fluorescent lamp	8000
127 W low pressure sodium vapor lamp	25,000
400 W metal-halide lamp	40,000
The Sun	3.6×10^{28} (Note: 3.846×10^{26} W × 93 lm/W)
Values are given for newly manufactured sources. The output from many sources decreases significantly over their lifetime.
