= Luminous energy =

Perceived light energy

In photometry, luminous energy is the perceived energy of light. This is sometimes called the quantity of light. Luminous energy is not the same as radiant energy, the corresponding objective physical quantity. This is because the human eye can only see light in the visible spectrum and has different sensitivities to light of different wavelengths within the spectrum. When adapted for bright conditions (photopic vision), the eye is most sensitive to light at a wavelength of 555 nm. Light with a given amount of radiant energy will have more luminous energy if the wavelength is 555 nm than if the wavelength is longer or shorter. Light whose wavelength is well outside the visible spectrum has a luminous energy of zero, regardless of the amount of radiant energy present.

The SI unit of luminous energy is the lumen second, which is unofficially known as the "talbot" in honor of William Henry Fox Talbot. In other systems of units, luminous energy may be expressed in basic units of energy.

== Explanation ==
Luminous energy $Q_\mathrm v$ is related to radiant energy $Q_\mathrm e$ by the expression $Q_\mathrm v = 683.002\ \mathrm{lm/W} \cdot \int^\infin_0 Q_\mathrm e(\lambda) \overline{y}(\lambda) \, \mathrm d\lambda.$ Here $\lambda$ is the wavelength of light, and $\overline{y}(\lambda)$ is the luminous efficiency function, which represents the eye's sensitivity to different wavelengths of light.

Luminous energy is the integrated luminous flux in a given period of time: $Q_\mathrm{v} = \int_{0}^{T} \mathit{\Phi_\mathrm{v}}(t) \, \mathrm{d}t$

== See also ==
- Coefficient of utilization
- Radiant energy

SI photometry quantities
Quantity		Unit		Dimension (Note: The symbols in this column denote dimensions; "L", "T" and "J" are for length, time and luminous intensity respectively, not the symbols for the units litre, tesla and joule.)	Notes
Name	Symbol (Note: Standards organizations recommend that photometric quantities be denoted with a subscript "v" (for "visual") to avoid confusion with radiometric or photon quantities. For example: USA Standard Letter Symbols for Illuminating Engineering USAS Z7.1-1967, Y10.18-1967)	Name	Symbol	Dimension	Notes
Luminous energy	Q_{v} (Note: Alternative symbols sometimes seen: W for luminous energy, P or F for luminous flux, and ρ for luminous efficacy of a source.)	lumen second	lm⋅s	T⋅J	The lumen second is sometimes called the talbot.
Luminous flux, luminous power	Φ_{v}	lumen (= candela steradian)	lm (= cd⋅sr)	J	Luminous energy per unit time
Luminous intensity	I_{v}	candela (= lumen per steradian)	cd (= lm/sr)	J	Luminous flux per unit solid angle
Luminance	L_{v}	candela per square metre	cd/m^{2} (= lm/(sr⋅m^{2}))	L^{−2}⋅J	Luminous flux per unit solid angle per unit projected source area. The candela per square metre is sometimes called the nit.
Illuminance	E_{v}	lux (= lumen per square metre)	lx (= lm/m^{2})	L^{−2}⋅J	Luminous flux incident on a surface
Luminous exitance, luminous emittance	M_{v}	lumen per square metre	lm/m^{2}	L^{−2}⋅J	Luminous flux emitted from a surface
Luminous exposure	H_{v}	lux second	lx⋅s	L^{−2}⋅T⋅J	Time-integrated illuminance
Luminous energy density	ω_{v}	lumen second per cubic metre	lm⋅s/m^{3}	L^{−3}⋅T⋅J	
Luminous efficacy (of radiation)	K	lumen per watt	lm/W	M^{−1}⋅L^{−2}⋅T^{3}⋅J	Ratio of luminous flux to radiant flux
Luminous efficacy (of a source)	η	lumen per watt	lm/W	M^{−1}⋅L^{−2}⋅T^{3}⋅J	Ratio of luminous flux to power consumption
Luminous efficiency, luminous coefficient	V			1	Luminous efficacy normalized by the maximum possible efficacy
See also: SI; Photometry; Radiometry
