= Lux =

SI derived unit of illuminance

lux
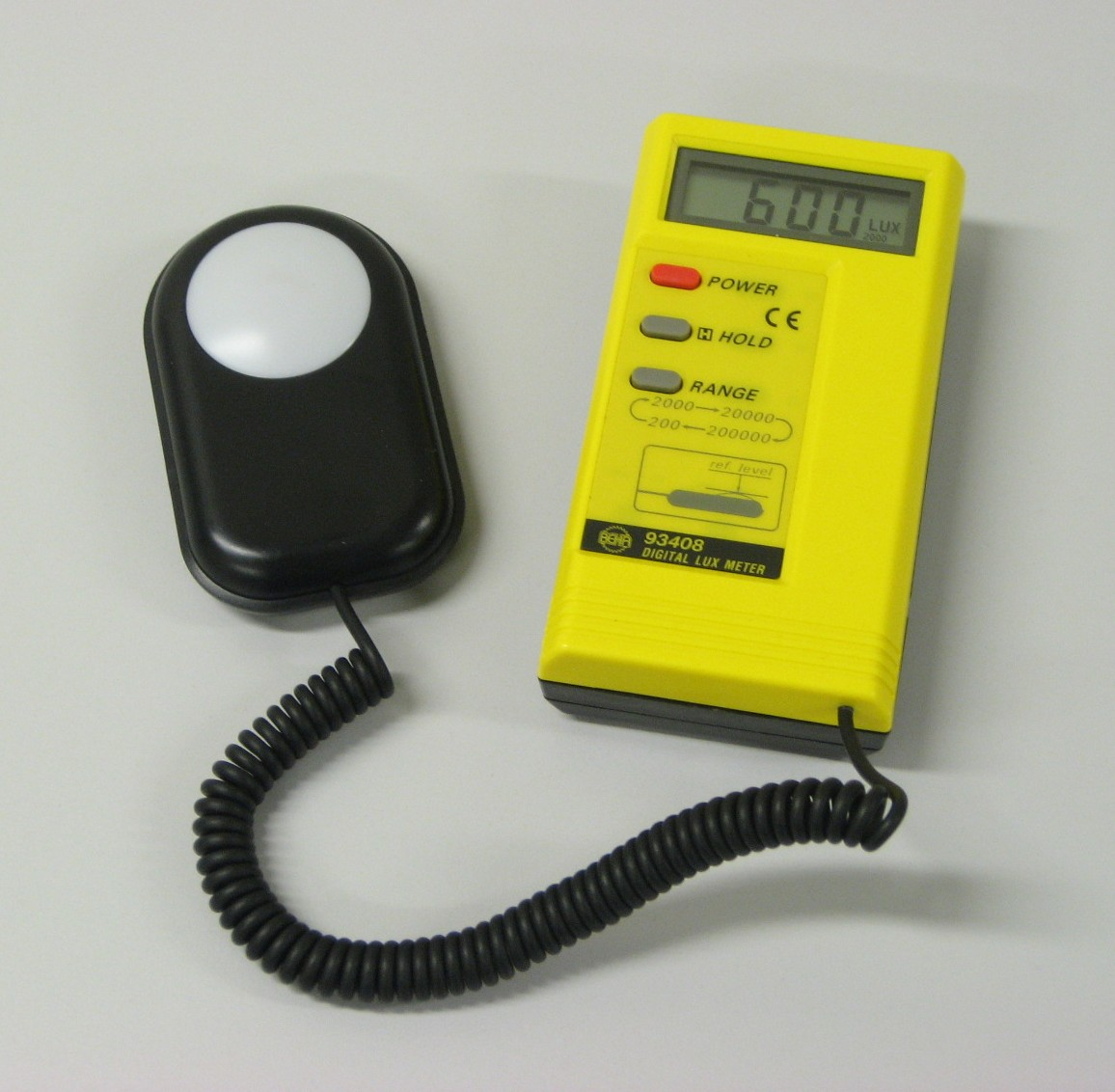
- A lux meter for measuring illuminance

General information
- Unit system: SI
- Unit of: illuminance
- Symbol: lx

Conversions
1 lx in ...	... is equal to ...
- SI base units: cd⋅sr⋅m^{−2}
- US customary units: 0.0929 fc
- CGS units: 10^{−4} ph

The lux (symbol: lx) is the unit of illuminance, or luminous flux per unit area, in the International System of Units (SI). It is equal to one lumen per square metre. In photometry, this is used as a measure of the irradiance, as perceived by the spectrally unequally responding human eye, of light that hits or passes through a surface. It is analogous to the radiometric unit watt per square metre, but with the power at each wavelength weighted according to the luminosity function, a model of human visual brightness perception, standardized by the CIE and ISO. In English, "lux" is used as both the singular and plural form. The word is derived from the Latin word for "light", lux.

== Explanation ==
=== Illuminance ===
Illuminance is a measure of how much luminous flux is spread over a given area. One can think of luminous flux (with the unit lumen) as a measure of the total "amount" of visible light present, and the illuminance as a measure of the intensity of illumination on a surface. A given amount of light will illuminate a surface more dimly if it is spread over a larger area, so illuminance is inversely proportional to area when the luminous flux is held constant.

One lux is equal to one lumen per square metre:

1 lx = 1 lm/m^{2} = 1 cd·sr/m^{2}.

A flux of 1000 lumens, spread uniformly over an area of 1 square metre, lights up that square metre with an illuminance of 1000 lux. However, the same 1000 lumens spread out over 10 square metres produces a dimmer illuminance of only 100 lux.

Achieving an illuminance of 500 lx might be possible in a home kitchen with a single fluorescent light fixture with an output of 12000 lumens. To light a factory floor with dozens of times the area of the kitchen would require dozens of such fixtures. Thus, lighting a larger area to the same illuminance (lux) requires a greater luminous flux (lumen).

As with other named SI units, SI prefixes can be used. For example, 1 kilolux (klx) is 1000 lx.

Here are some examples of the illuminance provided under various conditions:

Illuminance (lux)	Surfaces illuminated by
0.0001	Moonless, overcast night sky (starlight)
0.002	Moonless clear night sky with airglow
0.01	Quarter moon on a clear night
0.05–0.3	Full moon on a clear night
3.4	Dark limit of civil twilight under a clear sky
20–50	Public areas with dark surroundings
50	Family living room lights (Australia, 1998)
80	Office building hallway/toilet lighting
100	Very dark overcast day
150	Railway station platforms
320–500	Office lighting
400	Sunrise or sunset on a clear day.
1000	Overcast day; typical TV studio lighting
10,000–25,000	Full daylight (not direct sun)
32,000–100,000	Direct sunlight

The illuminance provided by a light source on a surface perpendicular to the direction to the source is a measure of the strength of that source as perceived from that location. For instance, a star of apparent magnitude 0 provides 2.08 microlux (μlx) at the Earth's surface. A barely perceptible magnitude 6 star provides 8 nanolux (nlx). The unobscured Sun provides an illumination of up to 100 kilolux (klx) on the Earth's surface, the exact value depending on time of year and atmospheric conditions. This direct normal illuminance is related to the solar illuminance constant E_{sc}, equal to 128000 lux (see Sunlight and Solar constant).

The illuminance on a surface depends on how the surface is tilted with respect to the source. For example, a pocket flashlight aimed at a wall will produce a given level of illumination if aimed perpendicular to the wall, but if the flashlight is aimed at increasing angles to the perpendicular (maintaining the same distance), the illuminated spot becomes larger and so is less highly illuminated. When a surface is tilted at an angle to a source, the illumination provided on the surface is reduced because the tilted surface subtends a smaller solid angle from the source, and therefore it receives less light. For a point source, the illumination on the tilted surface is reduced by a factor equal to the cosine of the angle between a ray coming from the source and the normal to the surface. In practical lighting problems, given information on the way light is emitted from each source and the distance and geometry of the lighted area, a numerical calculation can be made of the illumination on a surface by adding the contributions of every point on every light source.

=== Relationship between illuminance and irradiance ===
Like all photometric units, the lux has a corresponding "radiometric" unit. The difference between any photometric unit and its corresponding radiometric unit is that radiometric units are based on physical power, with all wavelengths being weighted equally, while photometric units take into account the fact that the human eye's image-forming visual system is more sensitive to some wavelengths than others, and accordingly every wavelength is given a different weight. The weighting factor is known as the luminosity function.

The lux is one lumen per square metre (lm/m^{2}), and the corresponding radiometric unit, which measures irradiance, is the watt per square metre (W/m^{2}). There is no single conversion factor between lux and W/m^{2}; there is a different conversion factor for every wavelength, and it is not possible to make a conversion unless one knows the spectral composition of the light.

The peak of the luminosity function is at 555 nm (green); the eye's image-forming visual system is more sensitive to light of this wavelength than any other. For monochromatic light of this wavelength, the amount of illuminance for a given amount of irradiance is maximum: 683.002 lx per 1 W/m^{2}; the irradiance needed to make 1 lx at this wavelength is about 1.464 mW/m^{2}. Other wavelengths of visible light produce fewer lux per watt-per-meter-squared. The luminosity function falls to zero for wavelengths outside the visible spectrum.

For a light source with mixed wavelengths, the number of lumens per watt can be calculated by means of the luminosity function. In order to appear reasonably "white", a light source cannot consist solely of the green light to which the eye's image-forming visual photoreceptors are most sensitive, but must include a generous mixture of red and blue wavelengths, to which they are much less sensitive.

This means that white (or whitish) light sources produce far fewer lumens per watt than the theoretical maximum of 683.002 lm/W. The ratio between the actual number of lumens per watt and the theoretical maximum is expressed as a percentage known as the luminous efficiency. For example, a typical incandescent light bulb has a luminous efficiency of only about 2%.

In reality, individual eyes vary slightly in their luminosity functions. However, photometric units are precisely defined and precisely measurable. They are based on an agreed-upon standard luminosity function based on measurements of the spectral characteristics of image-forming visual photoreception in many individual human eyes.

== Use in video-camera specifications ==
Specifications for video cameras such as camcorders and surveillance cameras often include a minimal illuminance level in lux at which the camera will record a satisfactory image. A camera with good low-light capability will have a lower lux rating. Still cameras do not use such a specification, since longer exposure times can generally be used to make pictures at very low illuminance levels, as opposed to the case in video cameras, where a maximal exposure time is generally set by the frame rate.

== Non-SI units of illuminance ==
The corresponding unit in English and American traditional units is the foot-candle. One foot candle is about 10.764 lx. Since one foot-candle is the illuminance cast on a surface by a one-candela source one foot away, a lux could be thought of as a "metre-candle", although this term is discouraged because it does not conform to SI standards for unit names.

One phot (ph) equals 10 kilolux (10 klx).

One nox (nx) equals 1 millilux (1 mlx) at light color 2042 K or 2046 K (formerly 2360 K).

In astronomy, apparent magnitude is a measure of the illuminance of a star on the Earth's atmosphere. A star with apparent magnitude 0 is 2.54 microlux outside the Earth's atmosphere, and 82% of that (2.08 microlux) under clear skies. A magnitude 6 star (just barely visible under good conditions) would be 8.3 nanolux. A standard candle (one candela) a kilometre away would provide an illuminance of 1 microlux—about the same as a magnitude 1 star.

Units of illuminance that are defined using other luminous efficiency functions are also sometimes called "lux". For example, using the melanopic function describing melanopsin response, one can define melanopic equivalent daylight illuminance, measured in lux. Similarly alternate versions of lux can be defined for nonhuman animal species. See Luminous efficiency function § Other functions.

== Legacy Unicode symbol ==
Unicode includes a symbol for "lx": U+33D3 ㏓ SQUARE LX. It is a legacy code to accommodate old code pages in some Asian languages. Use of this code is not recommended in new documents.

== SI photometry units ==
SI photometry quantities
Quantity		Unit		Dimension (Note: The symbols in this column denote dimensions; "L", "T" and "J" are for length, time, and luminous intensity respectively, not the symbols for the units litre, tesla, and joule.)	Notes
Name	Symbol (Note: Standards organizations recommend that photometric quantities be denoted with a subscript "v" (for "visual") to avoid confusion with radiometric or photon quantities. For example: USA Standard Letter Symbols for Illuminating Engineering USAS Z7.1-1967, Y10.18-1967)	Name	Symbol	Dimension	Notes
Luminous energy	Q_{v} (Note: Alternative symbols sometimes seen: W for luminous energy, P or F for luminous flux, and ρ for luminous efficacy of a source.)	lumen second	lm⋅s	T⋅J	The lumen second is sometimes called the talbot.
Luminous flux, luminous power	Φ_{v}	lumen (= candela steradian)	lm (= cd⋅sr)	J	Luminous energy per unit time
Luminous intensity	I_{v}	candela (= lumen per steradian)	cd (= lm/sr)	J	Luminous flux per unit solid angle
Luminance	L_{v}	candela per square metre	cd/m^{2} (= lm/(sr⋅m^{2}))	L^{−2}⋅J	Luminous flux per unit solid angle per unit projected source area. The candela per square metre is sometimes called the nit.
Illuminance	E_{v}	lux (= lumen per square metre)	lx (= lm/m^{2})	L^{−2}⋅J	Luminous flux incident on a surface
Luminous exitance, luminous emittance	M_{v}	lumen per square metre	lm/m^{2}	L^{−2}⋅J	Luminous flux emitted from a surface
Luminous exposure	H_{v}	lux second	lx⋅s	L^{−2}⋅T⋅J	Time-integrated illuminance
Luminous energy density	ω_{v}	lumen second per cubic metre	lm⋅s/m^{3}	L^{−3}⋅T⋅J	
Luminous efficacy (of radiation)	K	lumen per watt	lm/W	M^{−1}⋅L^{−2}⋅T^{3}⋅J	Ratio of luminous flux to radiant flux
Luminous efficacy (of a source)	η	lumen per watt	lm/W	M^{−1}⋅L^{−2}⋅T^{3}⋅J	Ratio of luminous flux to power consumption
Luminous efficiency, luminous coefficient	V			1	Luminous efficacy normalized by the maximum possible efficacy
See also: SI; Photometry; Radiometry

== See also ==
- Exposure value
