= Electron-stimulated luminescence =

Production of light by an electron beam

Electron-stimulated luminescence (ESL) is production of light by cathodoluminescence, i.e. by a beam of electrons made to hit a fluorescent phosphor surface. This is also the method used to produce light in a cathode ray tube (CRT). Experimental light bulbs that were made using this technology do not include magnetic or electrostatic means to deflect the electron beam.

A cathodoluminescent light has a transparent glass envelope coated on the inside with a light-emitting phosphor layer. Electrons emitted from a cathode strike the phosphor; the current returns through a transparent conductive coating on the envelope. The phosphor layer emits light through the transparent face of the envelope. The system has a power supply providing at least 5kVDC to the light emitting device, and the electrons transiting from cathode to anode are essentially unfocused. Additional circuits allow TRIAC-type dimmers to control the light level. Sample produced with lights produced so far have a color rendering index of 90. The energy consumption can be 70% less than that of a standard incandescent light bulb. Claimed lifetime can be as long as 10,000 hours which is more than ten times that of a standard incandescent light bulb.

Unlike fluorescent lamps, which produce light through the electrical excitation of mercury vapor, ESL lamps do not use mercury. The first commercially available ESL product was a reflector bulb.

Drawbacks include high weight, a slightly larger-than-normal base and – as with all cathode ray tubes – when switched on, a slight delay before illumination begins and a static charge which attracts dust to the bulb face. As of 2016 the cost is higher and claimed efficiency is less than half that of commercially available LED bulbs, although it is considerably better than that of traditional incandescent lamps.

== History ==
In 1958, Ferranti introduced a line of flood beam CRT-type stroboscope lamps.

Following delays, one company, called Vu1 Corporation, released ESL lamp samples in 2011. The company has not continued in operation.

== See also ==
- CRT projector
- Nimo tube
- Electroluminescence
  - Electroluminescent display (ELD)
- Fluorescence
  - Fluorescent lamp
- List of light sources
