= Jules Violle =

French physicist (1841–1923)

- Born: 16 November 1841; Langres, France
- Died: 12 September 1923 (aged 81); Fixin, France
- Known for: Solar constant Violle(measurement of directional light later devalued to define the international standard the candela)
- Scientific career
- Fields: Physics; Luminous intensity
- Workplaces: École Normale Supérieure, University of Grenoble, University of Lyon
- Thesis: Sur l'équivalent mécanique de la chaleur (1870)
- Doctoral students: Pierre Weiss

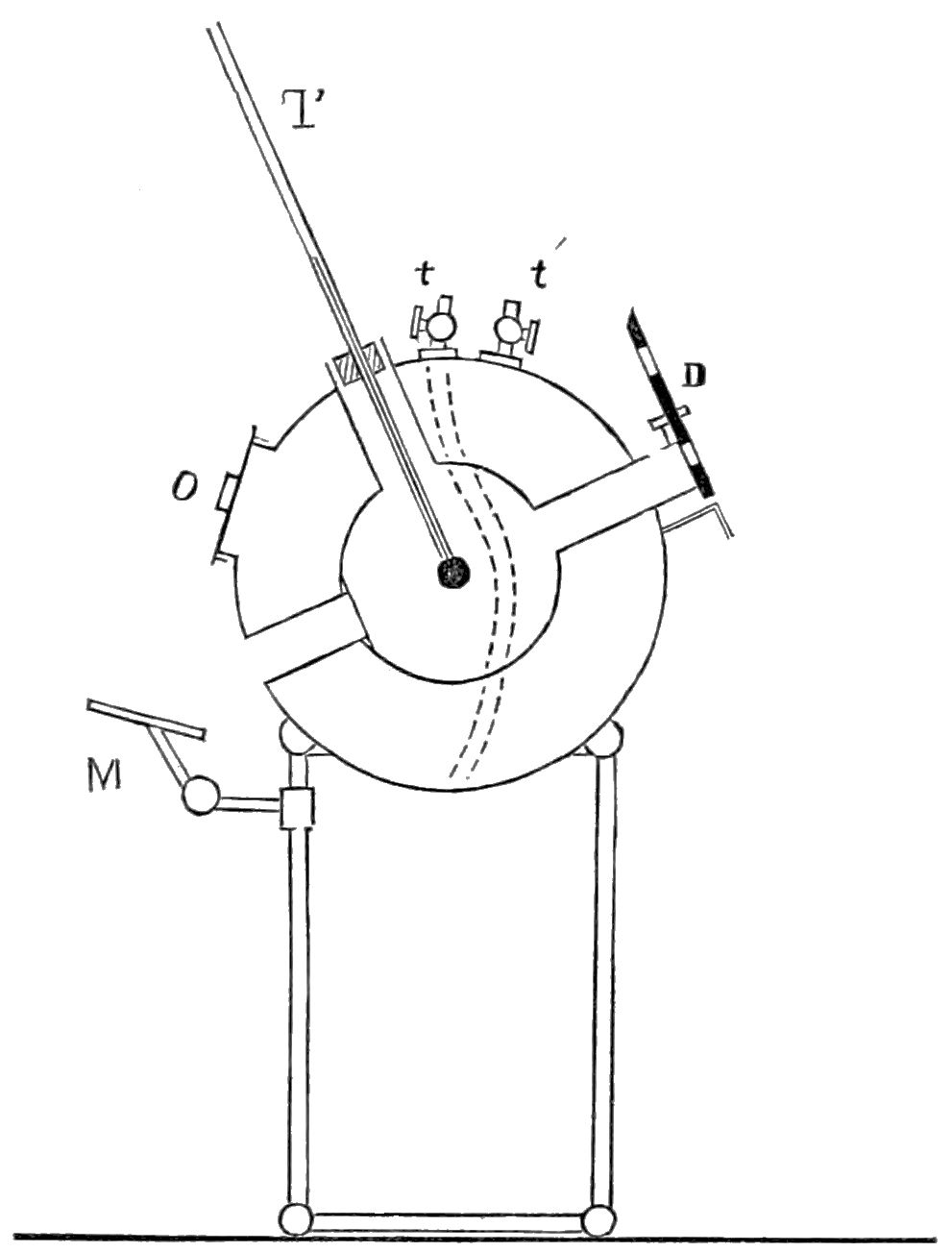
Sketch of Violle's actinometer concept

Jules Louis Gabriel Violle (16 November 1841 – 12 September 1923) was a French physicist and inventor.

He is notable for having determined the solar constant at Mont Blanc in 1875, and, in 1881, for proposing a standard for luminous intensity, called the Violle, equal to the light emitted by 1 cm² of platinum at its melting point. It was the first unit of light intensity that did not depend on the properties of a particular lamp. This was much larger than traditional measures such as candlepower, so the standard SI unit candela was originally defined in 1946 as 1/60 Violle.

During his career, Violle taught at several colleges including the University of Lyon and the Conservatoire des Arts et Métiers in Paris. He was one of the founders of the Institut d'optique théorique et appliquée and the École supérieure d'optique. He improved and invented a number of devices for measuring radiation, and determined the freezing and melting points of palladium.
