= SI base unit =

One of the seven units of measurement that define the metric system

The seven SI base units: Symbol / Name / Base quantity; s / second / time; m / metre / length; kg / kilogram / mass; A / ampere / electric current; K / kelvin / thermodynamic temperature; mol / mole / amount of substance; cd / candela / luminous intensity

The SI base units are the standard units of measurement defined by the International System of Units (SI) for the seven base quantities of what is now known as the International System of Quantities: they are notably a basic set from which all other SI units can be derived. The units and their physical quantities are the second for time, the metre (also spelled meter) for length or distance, the kilogram for mass, the ampere for electric current, the kelvin for thermodynamic temperature, the mole for amount of substance, and the candela for luminous intensity. The SI base units are a fundamental part of modern metrology, and thus part of the foundation of modern science and technology.

The SI base units form a set of mutually independent dimensions as required by dimensional analysis commonly employed in science and technology.

The names and symbols of SI base units are written in lowercase, except the symbols of those named after a person, which are written with an initial capital letter. For example, the metre has the symbol m, but the kelvin has symbol K, because it is named after Lord Kelvin and the ampere with symbol A is named after André-Marie Ampère.

== Definitions ==
On 20 May 2019, as the final act of the 2019 revision of the SI, the BIPM officially introduced the following new definitions, replacing the preceding definitions of the SI base units.

SI base units
Name	Symbol	Measure	Post-2019 formal definition	Historical origin / justification	Dimension symbol
second	s	time	"The second, symbol s, is the SI unit of time. It is defined by taking the fixed numerical value of the caesium frequency, ∆ν_{Cs}, the unperturbed ground-state hyperfine transition frequency of the caesium 133 atom, to be 9192631770 when expressed in the unit Hz, which is equal to s^{−1}."	The day is divided into 24 hours, each hour divided into 60 minutes, each minute divided into 60 seconds. A second is 1 / (24 × 60 × 60) of the day. Historically, a day was defined as the mean solar day; i.e., the average time between two successive occurrences of local apparent solar noon.	T
metre	m	length	"The metre, symbol m, is the SI unit of length. It is defined by taking the fixed numerical value of the speed of light in vacuum c to be 299792458 when expressed in the unit m s^{−1}, where the second is defined in terms of ∆ν_{Cs}."	1 / 10000000 of the distance from the Earth's equator to the North Pole measured on the meridian arc through Paris.	L
kilogram	kg	mass	"The kilogram, symbol kg, is the SI unit of mass. It is defined by taking the fixed numerical value of the Planck constant h to be 6.62607015×10^{−34} when expressed in the unit J s, which is equal to kg m^{2} s^{−1}, where the metre and the second are defined in terms of c and ∆ν_{Cs}."	The mass of one litre of water at the temperature of melting ice. A litre is one thousandth of a cubic metre.	M
ampere	A	electric current	"The ampere, symbol A, is the SI unit of electric current. It is defined by taking the fixed numerical value of the elementary charge e to be 1.602176634×10^{−19} when expressed in the unit C, which is equal to A s, where the second is defined in terms of ∆ν_{Cs}."	The original "International Ampere" was defined electrochemically as the current required to deposit 1.118 milligrams of silver per second from a solution of silver nitrate.	I
kelvin	K	thermodynamic temperature	"The kelvin, symbol K, is the SI unit of thermodynamic temperature. It is defined by taking the fixed numerical value of the Boltzmann constant k to be 1.380649×10^{−23} when expressed in the unit J K^{−1}, which is equal to kg m^{2} s^{−2} K^{−1}, where the kilogram, metre and second are defined in terms of h, c and ∆ν_{Cs}."	The Celsius scale: the Kelvin scale uses the degree Celsius for its unit increment, but is a thermodynamic scale (0 K is absolute zero).	Θ
mole	mol	amount of substance	"The mole, symbol mol, is the SI unit of amount of substance. One mole contains exactly 6.022 140 76 × 10^{23} elementary entities. This number is the fixed numerical value of the Avogadro constant, N_{A}, when expressed in the unit mol^{−1} and is called the Avogadro number. The amount of substance, symbol n, of a system is a measure of the number of specified elementary entities. An elementary entity may be an atom, a molecule, an ion, an electron, any other particle or specified group of particles."	Atomic weight or molecular weight divided by the molar mass constant, 1 g/mol.	N
candela	cd	luminous intensity	"The candela, symbol cd, is the SI unit of luminous intensity in a given direction. It is defined by taking the fixed numerical value of the luminous efficacy of monochromatic radiation of frequency 540×10^{12} Hz, K_{cd}, to be 683 when expressed in the unit lm W^{−1}, which is equal to cd sr W^{−1}, or cd sr kg^{−1} m^{−2} s^{3}, where the kilogram, metre and second are defined in terms of h, c and ∆ν_{Cs}."	The candlepower, which is based on the light emitted from a burning candle of standard properties.	J

== 2019 revision of the SI ==
The SI system after 1983, but before the 2019 revision: Dependence of base unit definitions on other base units (for example, the metre is defined as the distance travelled by light in a specific fraction of a second), with the constants of nature and artefacts used to define them (such as the mass of the IPK for the kilogram).

New SI: Dependence of base unit definitions on physical constants with fixed numerical values and on other base units that are derived from the same set of constants. Arrows are shown in the opposite direction compared to typical dependency graphs, i.e. $a \rightarrow b$ in this chart means $b$ depends on $a$.

New base unit definitions were adopted on 16 November 2018, and they became effective on 20 May 2019. The definitions of the base units have been modified several times since the Metre Convention in 1875, and new additions of base units have occurred. Since the redefinition of the metre in 1960, the kilogram had been the only base unit still defined directly in terms of a physical artefact, rather than a property of nature. This led to a number of the other SI base units being defined indirectly in terms of the mass of the same artefact; the mole, the ampere, and the candela were linked through their definitions to the mass of the International Prototype of the Kilogram, a roughly golfball-sized platinum–iridium cylinder stored in a vault near Paris.

It has long been an objective in metrology to define the kilogram in terms of a fundamental constant, in the same way that the metre is now defined in terms of the speed of light. The 21st General Conference on Weights and Measures (CGPM, 1999) placed these efforts on an official footing, and recommended "that national laboratories continue their efforts to refine experiments that link the unit of mass to fundamental or atomic constants with a view to a future redefinition of the kilogram". Two possibilities attracted particular attention: the Planck constant and the Avogadro constant.

In 2005, the International Committee for Weights and Measures (CIPM) approved preparation of new definitions for the kilogram, the ampere, and the kelvin and it noted the possibility of a new definition of the mole based on the Avogadro constant. The 23rd CGPM (2007) decided to postpone any formal change until the next General Conference in 2011.

In a note to the CIPM in October 2009, Ian Mills, the President of the CIPM Consultative Committee – Units (CCU) catalogued the uncertainties of the fundamental constants of physics according to the current definitions and their values under the proposed new definition. He urged the CIPM to accept the proposed changes in the definition of the kilogram, ampere, kelvin, and mole so that they are referenced to the values of the fundamental constants, namely the Planck constant (h), the elementary charge (e), the Boltzmann constant (k), and the Avogadro constant (N_{A}). This approach was approved in 2018, only after measurements of these constants were achieved with sufficient accuracy.

== See also ==
- International vocabulary of metrology
- International System of Quantities
- Non-SI units mentioned in the SI
- Metric prefix
- Physical constant

Quantity			SI unit	
Name	Symbol	Dimension symbol	Unit name	Unit symbol
time, duration	t	T	second	s
length	l, x, r, etc.	L	metre	m
mass	m	M	kilogram	kg
electric current	I , i	I	ampere	A
thermodynamic temperature	T	Θ	kelvin	K
amount of substance	n	N	mole	mol
luminous intensity	I_{v}	J	candela	cd
