= Flik =

Flik may refer to:

- Flik, an ant and the main protagonist in the 1998 Disney/Pixar animated film A Bug's Life
- Flik (Suikoden), a character in videogame Suikoden
- Flik (unit), a unit in radio-astronomy
- Flik 10, an air company of Hungary
- Flik 14, an air company of Hungary

== See also ==
- Flik and Flok (disambiguation)
- Flick (disambiguation)
- Flok (disambiguation)
