= Flick =

Flick or Flicks may refer to:

== Arts ==
- Flick, slang term for film or movie
  - Chick flick, slang, sometimes derogatory, term for films aimed at a female audience
- Flick (2000 film), Irish film
- Flick (2008 film), a campy British horror film written and directed by David Howard
- The Flick, a 2013 off-Broadway play by Annie Baker
- Flicks (film), a 1982 anthology comedy film

=== Characters ===
- Felicity Scully ("Flick"), a fictional character from the Australian soap opera Neighbours
- Flick Feathers, a character from the Malaysian animated series Chuck Chicken
- Flick, a character from the 1983 Christmas film A Christmas Story
- Flick Duck, a character from the American animated children's television series PB&J Otter
- Herr Otto Flick, a fictional character in the BBC sitcom 'Allo 'Allo!
- Tracy Flick, a fictional character who is the subject of the 1998 novel Election by Tom Perrotta
- Flick, a character from the 2020 video game Animal Crossing: New Horizons

== People ==
=== Surname ===
- Flick (surname)

=== Given name ===
- Flick Colby (1946–2011), American dancer and choreographer
- Flick Rea (1938–2026), English Liberal Democrat politician

== Other ==
- DVD Flick, an open source DVD authoring application for Windows
- Flick (fencing), a technique used in modern fencing
- Flick (physics), a unit of spectral radiance
- Flick (time), a unit of time a bit longer than a nanosecond, created by Facebook, used in video production
- Flicks (website), an online platform for moviegoers hosted by Vista Group International
- Flicks (Cartoon Network), a 2008–14 Cartoon Network programming block
- The Flicks Community Movie Houses, a defunct independent movie theater in Cambodia.

== See also ==
- FLIC (disambiguation)
- Flicker (disambiguation)
- Flik (disambiguation)
