= SDSS J092048.27+302818.3 =

Elliptical galaxy located in the constellation Cancer

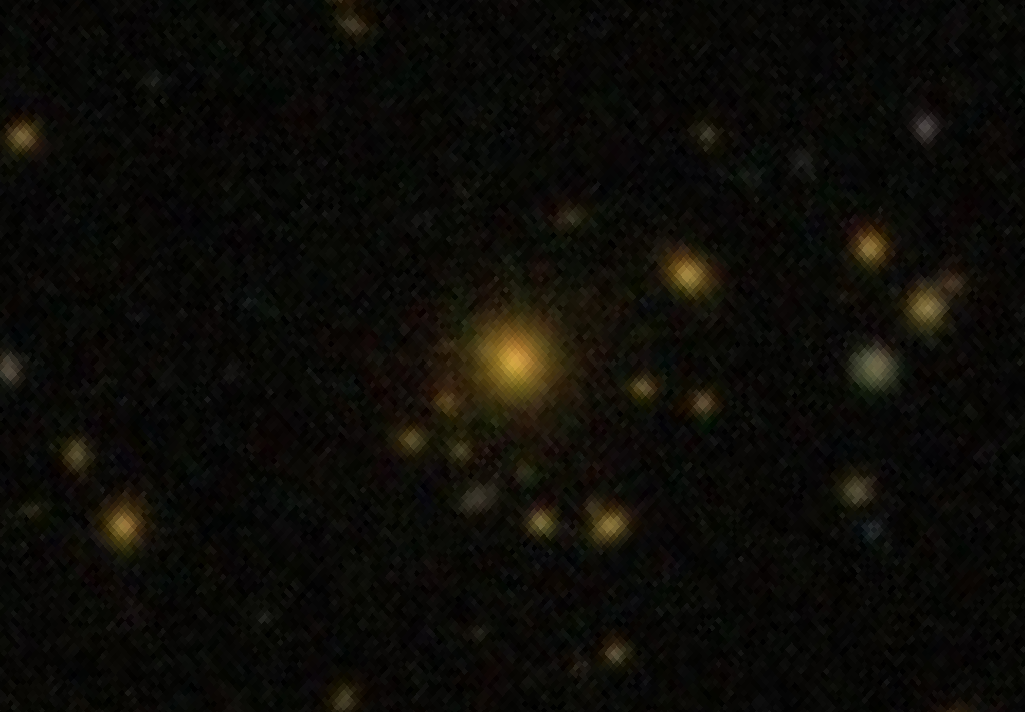
- SDSS image of SDSS J092048.27+302818.3

Observation data (J2000.0 epoch)
- Constellation: Cancer
- Right ascension: 09^{h} 20^{m} 48.27^{s}
- Declination: +30° 28′ 18.34″
- Redshift: 0.288137
- Heliocentric radial velocity: 86,381 ± 14 km/s
- Distance: 4,167.9 ± 291.7 Mly (1,277.87 ± 89.45 Mpc)
- Group or cluster: GMBCG J140.20117+30.47176
- magnitude (J): 14.53

Characteristics
- Type: BrClG
- Size: ~625,000 ly (191.7 kpc) (estimated)

Other designations
- 2MASX J09204829+3028179, GMBCG J140.20117+30.47176 BCG, OGC 0330, LEDA 1905147, SDSS J092048.27+302818.3 FG, SHELS J140.2012763+30.4717820, SSTSL2 J092048.28+302818.4

SDSS J092048.27+302818.3 also known as OGC 330 and SHELS J140.2012763+30.4717820 is a elliptical galaxy located in the constellation of Cancer. The redshift of the galaxy is (z) 0.288.

SDSS J092048.27+302818.3 is a massive elliptical galaxy of Type E morphology, residing as the brightest cluster galaxy of the GMBCG J140.20117+30.47176 galaxy cluster. The total R-band magnitude of the galaxy has been estimated to be 16.903 ± 0.001 while its total stellar mass is calculated to be 11.89^{+0.06}_{−0.08} M_{☉}.

The total half-light radius of the galaxy has been estimated to be 2.7396 ± 0.0058 or 4.25 arcseconds while the axial ratios is calculated to be 0.9278 ± 0.0009. Evidence also found it is an early-type galaxy shown lensing an emission-line galaxy located in the background with a redshift of (z) 0.3918. The stellar velocity dispersion of the galaxy itself is 297 ± 17 kilometers per seconds while the major axis position angle of the galaxy is 30°. The total AB magnitude is 16.25. A study published in 2022 has recalculated the stellar mass of the galaxy as 11.786^{+0.092}_{−0.120} M_{☉}.
