= Electromagnetic flux =

Electromagnetic flux may refer to one of the following:

- Flux or flux density of electromagnetic radiation
- Electric flux and magnetic flux
- Radiative flux.
