= Landolt space mission =

The Landolt space mission is a NASA project that, if completed, will put a man-made "star" in the Earth's orbit. The mission is a part of NASA's Pioneers Program and led by George Mason University. The payload of the astronomical object will be built in collaboration with the National Institute of Standards and Technology (NIST), who are additionally expected to provide laser beacons. Landolt will serve multiple purposes—it will aid scientists in the calibration of telescopes, measure the brightness of stars and supernovae, and provide new ways for researchers to study how the universe is expanding and prove how dark energy relates to the expansion by way of absolute flux calibration.

The mission is named for late astronomer Arlo Landolt and has a budget of 19.5 million dollars. It is expected to launch in 2029. Mission control will be based in Fairfax, Virginia. The team also includes Blue Canyon Technologies, the California Institute of Technology, Mississippi State University, Montreal Planetarium and Montreal University, Lawrence Berkeley National Laboratory, the University of Florida, the University of Hawai'i, the University of Victoria, and the University of Minnesota Duluth.
