= FLIC =

FLIC may refer to:

- FLIC (file format), an animation file format
- Florida Legislative Investigation Committee, a government committee in Florida, US, which investigated allegedly subversive activity
- Fluorescence interference contrast microscopy, an optical technique for axial resolution in the nanometer regime

== See also ==
- Flick (disambiguation)
- Flic, 2005 film by Masahiro Kobayashi (director)
- Un Flic, 1972 French crime film
