= Arlo U. Landolt =

American astronomer (1935–2022)

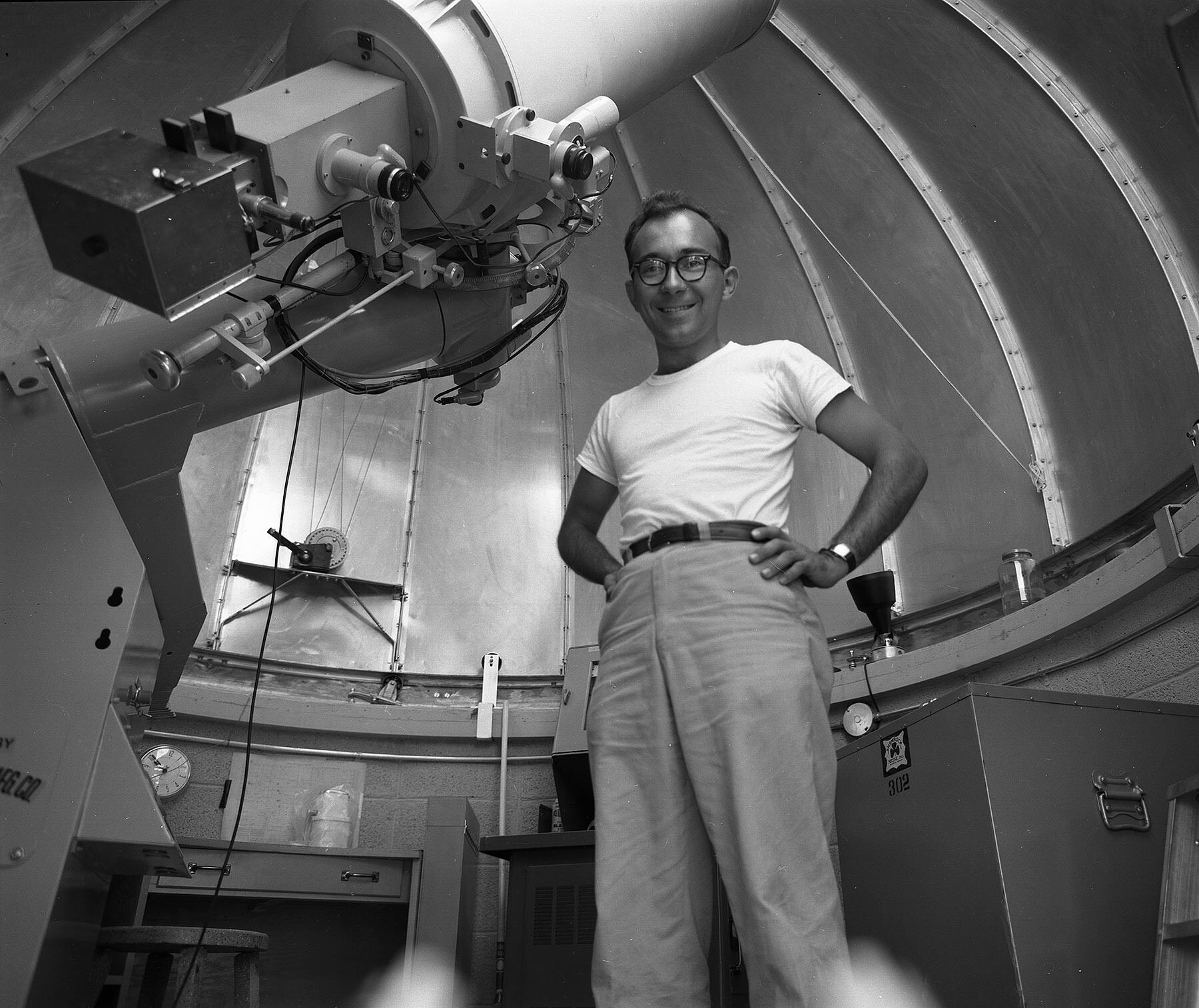
- Landolt with the Kitt Peak National Observatory's 16-inch telescope c. 1960
- Born: Arlo Udell Landolt; September 29, 1935; Highland, Illinois, U.S.
- Died: January 21, 2022 (aged 86)
- Education: Miami University (B.A.); Indiana University Bloomington (M.A., Ph.D.)
- Spouse: Eunice J. Casper (m. 1966)
- Awards: George van Biesbroeck Prize (1995)
- Scientific career
- Fields: Astronomy; Photometry
- Workplaces: Louisiana State University
- Thesis: A Photometric Investigation of the Galactic Clusters NGC 6087 and M25 (1963)
- Doctoral advisor: John B. Irwin

Arlo Udell Landolt (September 29, 1935 – January 21, 2022) was an American astronomer known for his widely used photometric standards.

== Life and career ==
=== Early life ===
Landolt was born in Highland, Illinois to farmers Arlo M. Landolt and Vesta Kraus Landolt on September 29, 1935. He was the oldest of 4 (one brother, 2 sisters) Darnell M., Faye Beth, Sheryl Sue. He attended a one-room country grade school called IXL Country Grade School. He graduated grade school in 7 of 8 years because they accelerated his education. All of Landolt's relatives, like his parents, were farmers. After finishing grade school, he was the first of his family to go the high school. While in high school he took all the classes for agriculture. It was not until later on that Landolt showed interest in mathematics, physics, and the sciences. He was involved in 4H clubs and projects. He would base his projects on the hogs on their farm but would try to use the purebred over the crossed and mixed breeds that his father would raise. He would sell the hogs to get a Funk and Wagnall’s Encyclopedia set. He graduated from Highland High School in 1952.

=== Education ===
After graduating, he wanted to attend Massachusetts Institute of Technology, but his family could not afford it. He instead attended Miami University in Oxford, Ohio for his undergraduate studies. He planned to transfer to Massachusetts Institute of Technology after his 3rd year in a program offered by the university, but decided to complete his schooling there. In order to attend the university he had a job as a busboy and washing dishes in the dorms as well as some help from his parents for tuition. Early on, he took a course on astronomy which he credits to be the start of his interest in that science. He wanted to push through college so he attended for 3 years and 2 summers. He obtained his Bachelor of Science degree in mathematics and physics from Miami University in 1955. He began his graduate studies at age 19 at Indiana University Bloomington in 1955. He attended for almost 7 years, 5 years being on campus and nearly 2 years being in the Antarctic after signing up for an expedition with the International Geophysical Year. The expedition was offered through the Arctic Institute of North America. He was stationed at the Amundsen-Scott South Pole Station with a group led by Paul Siple and it consisted of 9 other scientists, 9 Navy Sea-Bees, and a husky dog. He was hired as an aurora and air glow scientist along with the others hired to go on the expedition. He came back from the expedition during Christmas time in 1957. He received his Ph.D. in 1962 from Indiana University Bloomington. Although he finished all requirements for his degree in 1962, he had not received his degree until June 1963 and that is what is officially on the degree.

=== Research career ===
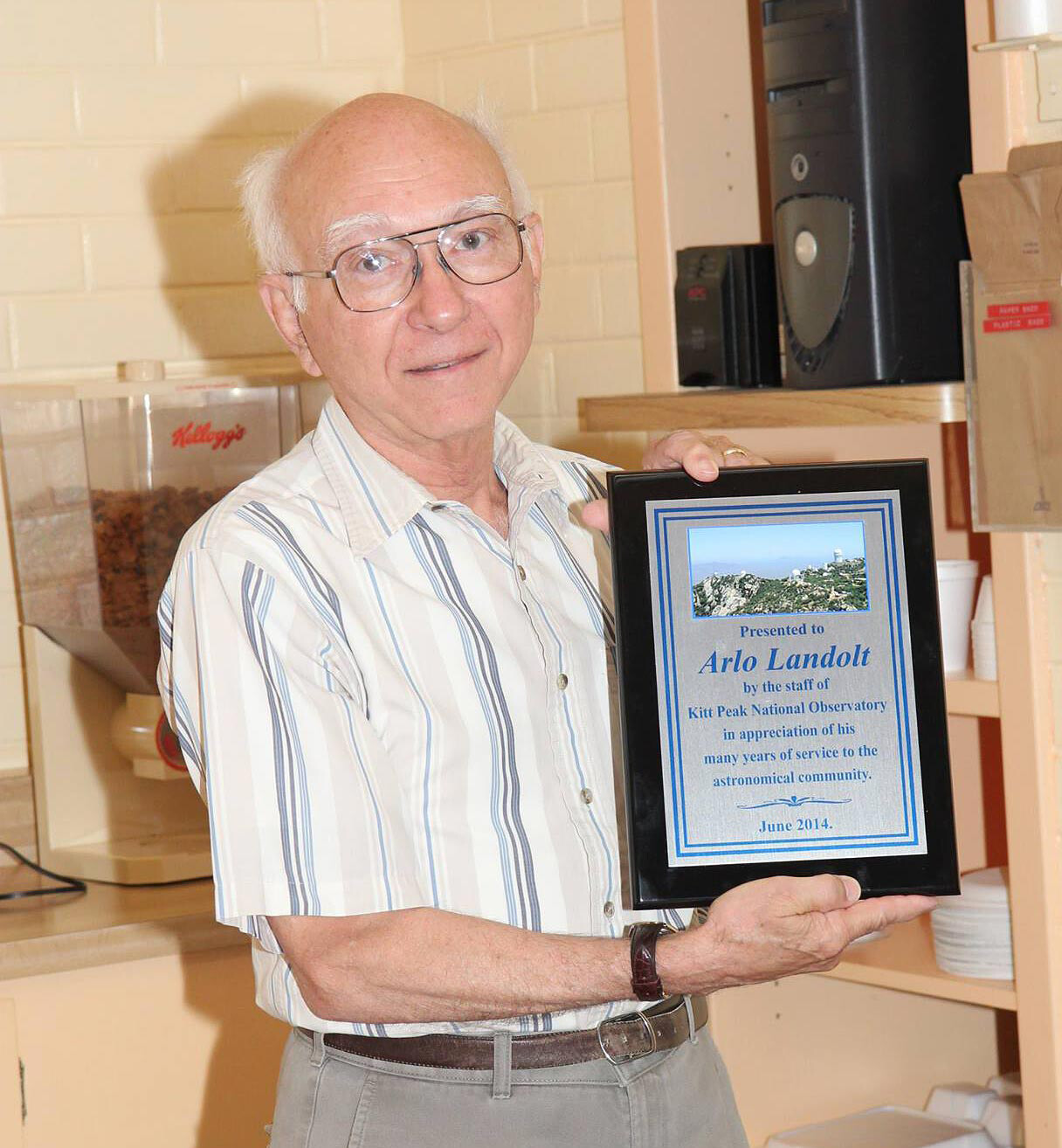
Landolt in 2014 with an award from Kitt Peak National Observatory

After graduating, Landolt served on committees with many organizations and was eventually elected Secretary of the American Astronomical Society. This occurred for 3 terms. He spent one year working for the National Science Foundation in Washington, D.C.

In his later years, he became reacquainted with a high school classmate, Eunice Casper. They got married and he helped raise her 4 daughters ages 6, 7, 8, and 10. They later had a daughter of their own named Jennifer Landolt Boutte.

He worked principally in photometry and published a number of widely used lists of standard stars.

Landolt died on January 21, 2022, at the age of 86.

== Honors and awards ==
- 1995: George van Biesbroeck Prize from the American Astronomical Society
- 1998: LSU Distinguished Faculty Award from Louisiana State University
- 2015: Leslie C. Peltier Award from the Astronomical League
- 2020: Legacy Fellow of the American Astronomical Society
- 2021: The William Tyler Olcott Distinguished Service Award from the American Association of Variable Star Observers

Mount Landolt in Ellsworth Land, Antarctica is named in his honor, as well as the Landolt Astronomical Observatory at Louisiana State University and the asteroid 15072 Landolt. A project of NASA's Pioneers Program, the Landolt space mission, is also named for Arlo. It aims to put an artificial star in the Earth's orbit.
