= Flik 14 =

Flik 14 (Flik 14J)
- Active: 1914 - 1918
- Country: Austria-Hungary
- Type: Air force
- Engagements: World War I

Commanders
- Notable commanders: Captain Jemő Kara; Lieutenant Károly Benedek

Flik 14, later Flik 14J (German: Fliegerkompanen 14, Hungarian: 14. repülőszázad) was an aviation company of the Austro-Hungarian Airforce during the First World War. The company used Phönix D.II aircraft.

== History ==
It was organized in 1914, the captain of the company was Jenő Kara. At the beginning it worked on the front lines in Russia, later it was sent to the Italian front. The second leader of the company was Lieutenant Károly Benedek Károly. The company has two known ace pilots. Karl Urban achieved his final victory while flying with Flik 14 in late 1917. Karl Teichmann had one of his victories while flying a Phönix D.IIa with Flik 14. This was the downing of a British Bristol F.2B Fighter on 22 August 1918 over Monte Asolone, Italy.

The company's aircraft had a red band on the fuselage as a distinguishing mark, over which the initial of the pilot's surname was painted in white outline.

At the end of the war neither Austria, nor Hungary, was allowed to maintain an air force, so Flik 14 was disbanded.

=== Ace pilots ===
Name	Air wins in the company
Karl Urban	1
Karl Teichmann	1
