= Flik 10 =

- Active: 1914 - 1918
- Country: Austria-Hungary
- Type: Airforce

Flik 10 (German: Fliegerkompanen 10, Hungarian: 10. repülőszázad) was an aviation company of the Austro-Hungarian Airforce during the First World War.

== History ==
In January 1918, Jindra Struckel was appointed commander of Flik 11, although he soon got a more active command in Fliegergruppe G when he was posted to a bombing unit on the Italian front. He was injured during a night flight shortly after his arrival, and command of the squadron had to be passed on to Jindra's old pilot. In September 1915, he entered the LFT as an observer. In October, he was assigned to Flik 10 in Russia, shifting to Flik 20 in February 1916.

== Flying aces ==
Flik 10 had two flying aces during its existence.

Name	Air victories with Flik 10
Karl Urban	5
Otto Jäger	5
Total for two Flik 10 Aces	10
