= Susannah Lazar =

American medical physicist, amateur astronomer

Minor planets discovered: 1
20430 Stout	10 January 1999	MPC list^{[A]}
Co-discovery made with:^{A} W. R. Cooney Jr.

Susannah Lazar is an American medical physicist, amateur astronomer and a discoverer of minor planets.

She is affiliated with the Highland Road Park Observatory, where she co-discovered asteroid 20430 Stout with Walter R. Cooney, Jr. at age 16, and named it after her late great-grandfather Earl Douglas Stout (c. 1895–1985).

At the time she was a home school senior in Baton Rouge, Louisiana.

== See also ==
- List of minor planet discoverers
