= Walter R. Cooney Jr. =

American chemical engineer and amateur astronomer

Minor planets discovered: 47
see § List of discovered minor planets

Walter R. Cooney Jr. is an American chemical engineer, amateur astronomer and discoverer of minor planets and variable stars.

Cooney, who is affiliated with the Highland Road Park Observatory, is credited by the Minor Planet Center with the discovered of 47 numbered minor planets during 1998–2005, such as his lowest numbered identification 11739 Baton Rouge, a Hildian asteroid named after the city of Baton Rouge where the discovering observatory is located.

Many of his minor planet discoveries he made in collaboration with astronomers Matthew Collier, Patrick M. Motl, Susannah Lazar, Katrina Wefel, Terry Martin, Merrill Hess, Ethan Kandler, Meredith Howard, and most recently with John Gross.

Cooney is also credited with discovering more than 50 variable stars.

== List of discovered minor planets ==
| 11739 Baton Rouge^{[A]} | September 25, 1998 |
| 15072 Landolt^{[B]} | January 25, 1999 |
| 16107 Chanmugam | November 27, 1999 |
| 20430 Stout ^{[C]} | January 10, 1999 |
| 43083 Frankconrad | November 19, 1999 |
| (44370) 1998 SK_{35} ^{[D]} | September 27, 1998 |
| 47045 Seandaniel | November 29, 1998 |
| (49349) 1998 WW_{6}^{[B]} | November 24, 1998 |
| 49350 Katheynix | November 27, 1998 |
| (49454) 1998 YH_{22} ^{[E]} | December 30, 1998 |
| 53256 Sinitiere | March 16, 1999 |
| (53257) 1999 FF | March 16, 1999 |
| (59172) 1999 AE_{3} | January 10, 1999 |
| (60177) 1999 VU_{6} | November 8, 1999 |
| (66399) 1999 LH ^{[F]} | June 5, 1999 |
| (66946) 1999 XT_{1} | December 3, 1999 |
| (70723) 1999 VK_{1}^{[B]} | November 3, 1999 |
| 74439 Brenden | February 6, 1999 |
| (75249) 1999 XU_{1} | December 3, 1999 |

| 79912 Terrell | February 10, 1999 |
| (80698) 2000 CH_{1} | February 4, 2000 |
| (81531) 2000 HK_{14} ^{[F]} | April 29, 2000 |
| (85708) 1998 SL_{35} ^{[D]} | September 27, 1998 |
| (85805) 1998 WS_{6}^{[B]} | November 24, 1998 |
| 85878 Guzik ^{[G]} | February 13, 1999 |
| 101722 Pursell | March 10, 1999 |
| 101777 Robhoskins ^{[H]} | April 13, 1999 |
| (103221) 1999 YC_{5} | December 29, 1999 |
| (103222) 1999 YD_{5} | December 29, 1999 |
| (121206) 1999 PO_{3} | August 13, 1999 |
| (121543) 1999 VG_{1}^{[B]} | November 3, 1999 |
| (121544) 1999 VJ_{1}^{[B]} | November 3, 1999 |
| (122067) 2000 HJ_{5} | April 27, 2000 |
| (155680) 2000 JU_{10} | May 9, 2000 |
| (157330) 2004 TS_{16}^{[J]} | October 13, 2004 |
| 162158 Merrillhess^{[G]} | February 15, 1999 |
| (164761) 1998 WU_{6}^{[B]} | November 24, 1998 |
| (213127) 2000 DP_{3} | February 28, 2000 |

| (223794) 2004 TN_{10}^{[J]} | October 5, 2004 |
| (226857) 2004 TU_{13}^{[J]} | October 6, 2004 |
| 268115 Williamalbrecht^{[J]} | October 7, 2004 |
| (306444) 1998 WT_{6}^{[B]} | November 24, 1998 |
| (306501) 1999 VH_{1}^{[B]} | November 3, 1999 |
| (311355) 2005 RO_{32}^{[J]} | September 13, 2005 |
| (350491) 1999 VW_{8} | November 9, 1999 |
| 357546 Edwardhalbach^{[J]} | September 15, 2004 |
| 368617 Sebastianotero^{[J]} | October 5, 2004 |
Legend to co-discoverers:^{A} with Matthew Collier^{B} with Patrick M. Motl^{C} with Susannah Lazar^{D} with Katrina Wefel^{E} with Terry Martin^{F} with Merrill Hess^{G} with Ethan Kandler^{H} with Meredith Howard^{J} with John Gross
