= Aspera (spacecraft) =

NASA mission to study galaxy evolution

- Mission type: UV Astronomy
- Operator: NASA
- Website: https://science.nasa.gov/astrophysics/programs/astrophysics-pioneers/

Start of mission
- Launch date: 29 January 2027 (planned)
- Rocket: Electron
- Contractor: Rocket Lab

Orbital parameters
- Reference system: Geocentric orbit
- Regime: Sun-synchronous orbit

Aspera is a NASA small satellite astrophysical mission selected in 2020 as part of the Astrophysics Pioneers Program. The mission is designed to map diffuse extreme-ultraviolet (EUV) emission from hot gas in the circumgalactic medium (CGM) and intergalactic medium (IGM) of nearby galaxies by detecting the O VI doublet at 103.2 and 103.8 nm.

== Launch ==
NASA awarded the launch to Rocket Lab in May 2025 under the Venture-Class Acquisition of Dedicated and Rideshare (VADR) contract. Aspera will be launched on an Electron rocket from Launch Complex 1 in Mahia, New Zealand. As of August 2026, the launch is expected in January 2027.

== See also ==
- Pandora Mission
