= Landolt Astronomical Observatory =

Observatory in Louisiana, US

- Organization: Louisiana State University
- Location: Nicholson Hall, Louisiana State University, Baton Rouge, Louisiana, United States
- Coordinates: 30°24′44.8″N 91°10′44.75″W
- Weather: Clear Sky Chart
- Established: 1939
- Website: Observatory website

Telescopes
- 11.5-inch Alvan Clark refracting telescope
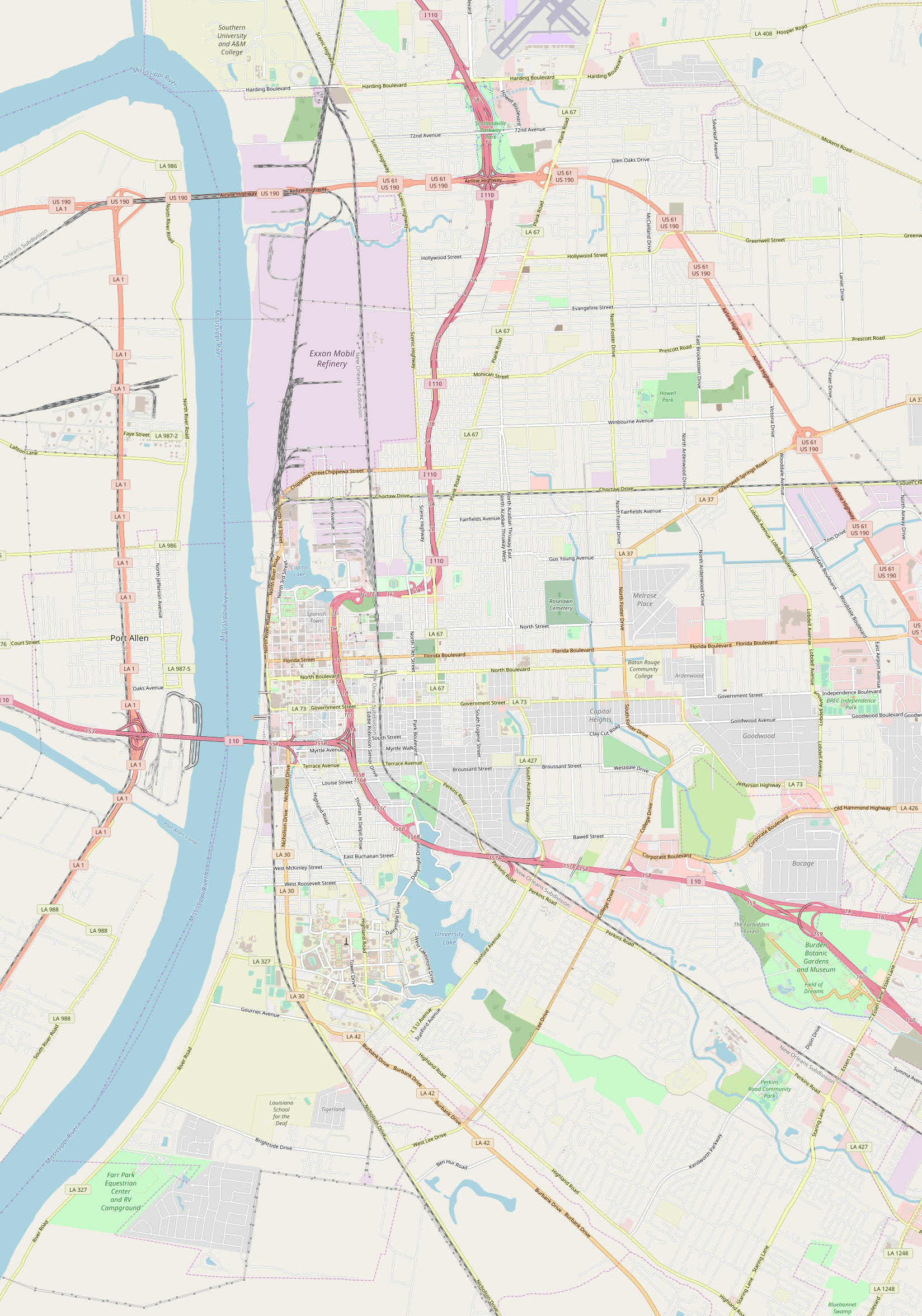
- Location within Baton Rouge

The Landolt Astronomical Observatory is an astronomical observatory located on the roof of Nicholson Hall at Louisiana State University (LSU) in Baton Rouge, Louisiana, United States. Operated by LSU's Department of Physics and Astronomy, the observatory houses a rare and historic 11.5-inch Alvan Clark & Sons refracting telescope, one of the few remaining large refractors of its type still in use.

== History ==
The observatory atop Nicholson Hall was first opened in 1939, shortly after the building's completion. Its primary instrument, the Alvan Clark refractor, was acquired at that time and has since become a campus landmark.

Throughout the mid-20th century, the observatory was regularly used for astronomical research, including astrophotography and photometric studies, as well as for LSU coursework and public outreach. From the late 1940s to the 1970s, the telescope supported various scientific investigations, although growing urban light pollution eventually limited its usefulness for cutting-edge research.

Despite declining research value, the observatory continued to host "Public Nights" and serve as a teaching resource through the early 1990s, becoming a cherished memory for many Baton Rouge residents and LSU alumni.

By the mid-1990s, however, the facility fell into disrepair. It was largely unused for over a decade. In 2005, a group from the Physics and Astronomy Department led a restoration effort, repairing the dome, refurbishing the telescope, and updating the observatory's facilities. The revitalized observatory reopened in November 2005 with a public viewing coinciding with Mars' close approach to Earth.

On March 30, 2006, the observatory was officially dedicated as the Landolt Astronomical Observatory, honoring Professor Arlo U. Landolt, a prominent LSU astronomer renowned for his work on standard photometric stars. Dr. Landolt's photometric standards remain fundamental to astronomical research worldwide, and the naming recognized his substantial contributions to LSU and the field of astronomy.

== Facilities and Telescope ==
The observatory’s primary instrument is an 11.5-inch (29 cm) aperture refracting telescope manufactured by Alvan Clark & Sons, a company renowned for its high-quality optics. The telescope provides high-magnification views well-suited for observing the Moon, planets, double stars, and bright nebulae.

The observatory is located on the top floor of Nicholson Hall, one of the oldest academic buildings on campus, constructed in 1937 and later expanded. Access to the observatory is by way of a winding staircase; inside, the space retains a vintage character, with much of its original furniture and fittings.

== Public Programs ==
The Landolt Observatory has a longstanding tradition of public engagement. It regularly hosts "Star Parties" and "Public Nights," which allow LSU students, alumni, and the general public to view celestial objects through the historic telescope. These events typically take place monthly and often attract large crowds, especially when notable astronomical events occur.

The observatory also serves as a teaching tool for undergraduate classes and occasionally for K–12 educational outreach.

== Namesake: Arlo U. Landolt ==
Arlo U. Landolt (1935–2022) was a distinguished astronomer and professor emeritus at LSU, widely recognized for his pioneering work in stellar photometry and the creation of widely used photometric standard star catalogs. His standards are considered fundamental for calibrating astronomical observations around the world, including those made by major observatories and space telescopes such as Hubble. Landolt joined the LSU faculty in 1962 and continued to be active in the Department of Observational Astronomy for decades.

== See also ==
- Highland Road Park Observatory
- List of astronomical observatories
