= Flik and Flok =

Flik and Flok may refer to:

- Flik and Flok, ballet in which Rita Sangalli made her 1865 debut
- Flik and Flok, fictional circus act in 1928 film Laugh, Clown, Laugh
- Flik and Flok, 1863 Italian club which evolved into Armida Rowing Club

== See also ==
- "Flik Flok", track on 2010 album Shits & Giggles
- Flik (disambiguation)
- Flok (disambiguation)
