= Flok =

Flok may refer to:

- Chakhon Philakhlang (born 1998), Thai footballer (nickname: Flok)
- flok (company), American company
- A group of rebels in the Faroese folktale of Floksmenn

== People ==
- First Lady of Kazakhstan (FLOK)

== See also ==
- Flik (disambiguation)
- Flik and Flok (disambiguation)
