= Pioneers Program =

NASA spaceflight program

The Pioneers or Astrophysics Pioneers Program is a NASA program started in 2020 intended to use low-cost, small-size hardware to carry out sub-orbital and space-based astrophysics investigations. The missions are expected to include SmallSats, balloon payloads, and payloads attached to the ISS, with a $20M cost cap.

Four concepts were chosen in January 2021:

- Aspera, a SmallSat to study galaxy evolution
- Pandora, a SmallSat launched on January 11th, 2026, to study at least 20 stars and their respective exoplanets in order to determine their atmospherical composition
- StarBurst, a SmallSat to detect high-energy gamma rays from neutron star mergers, targeted to launch in summer 2027
- PUEO (Payload for Ultrahigh Energy Observations), a balloon mission successfully launched on December 19, 2025 from the McMurdo Station’s Long Duration Balloon Facility in Antarctica for a 23-day flight in order to detect signals from neutrinos; future flights are possible

Three additional missions have been selected as of June 2026:

- TIGERISS (Trans-Iron Galactic Element Recorder on the International Space Station), selected in 2022 and anticipated to launch in 2027, a payload attached to the ISS to test models of nucleosynthesis and increase understanding of the production and distribution of elements in the galaxy
- Landolt space mission, selected in 2024, a SmallSat intended to act as an artificial "star" in the Earth's orbit, enabling the absolute flux calibration of telescopes and thus, more accurate measurements of brightness for astronomical objects
- POEMM (Planetary Origins and Evolution Multispectral Monochromator), selected in July 2024 and expected to launch around 2028, a balloon mission with a 1.8 meter telescope and multiple spectrometers that will study planet formation and evolution in the far infrared.
