= Highland Road Park Observatory =

Observatory in Louisiana, US

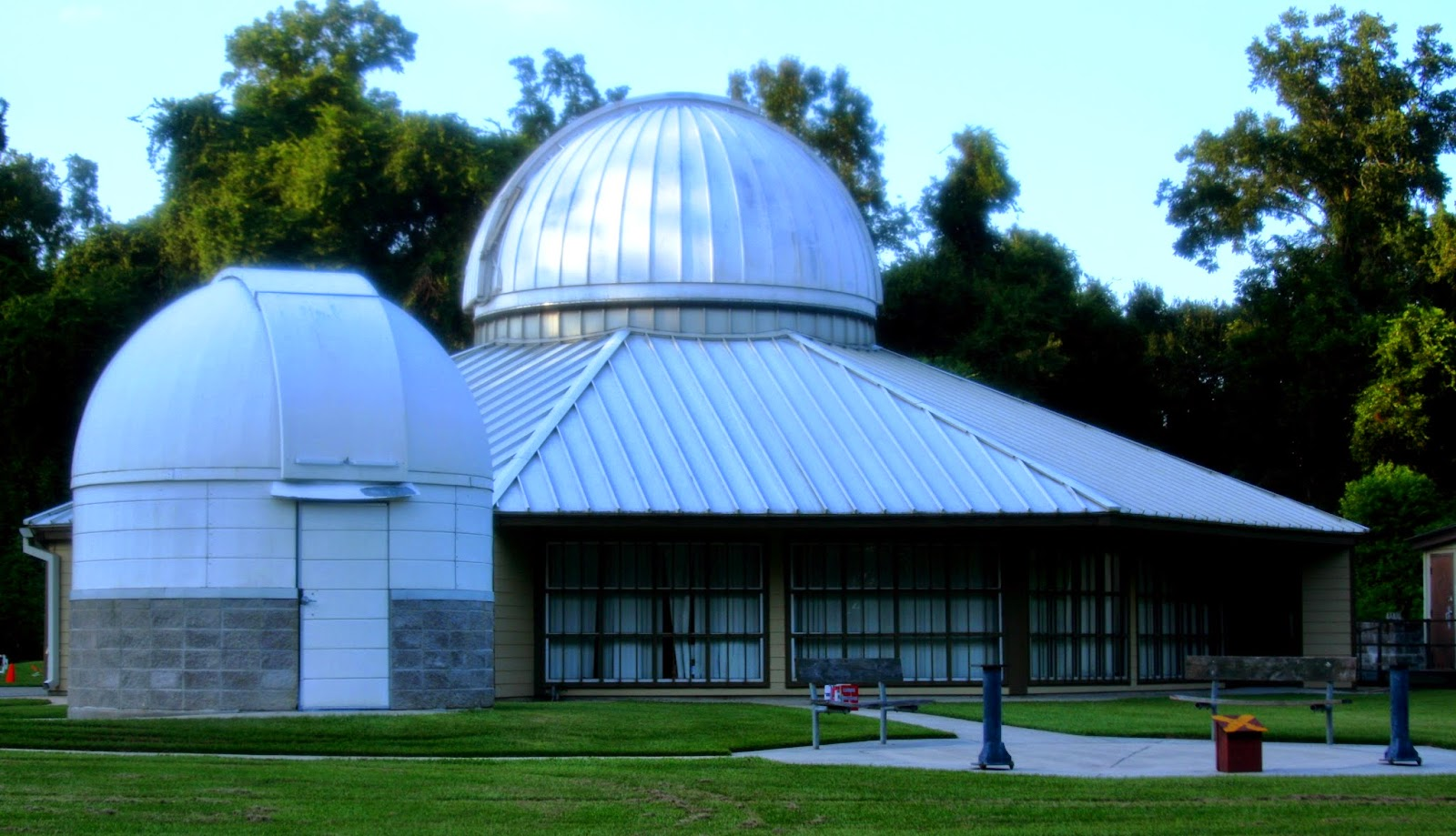
- Organization: Louisiana State University & Baton Rouge Astronomical Society & The Recreation & Park Commission for the Parish of East Baton Rouge
- Observatory code: 747
- Location: Baton Rouge, Louisiana, United States
- Coordinates: 30°20′45.85″N 91°04′14.84″W
- Altitude: 5 m (16 ft)
- Weather: Clear Sky Chart
- Established: 1997
- Website: www.bro.lsu.edu

Telescopes
- 20 inches (51 cm) Ritchey–Chrétien telescope (f/8.1)
- Location within Louisiana

Highland Road Park Observatory or Baton Rouge Observatory is an astronomical observatory jointly operated by Louisiana State University's astronomy department, Baton Rouge Astronomical Society, and The Recreation & Park Commission for the Parish of East Baton Rouge. It is in Baton Rouge, in the U.S. state of Louisiana, in Highland Road Park.

The observatory uses a 20-inch (51 cm) Ritchey–Chrétien telescope (f/8.1) with a hyperbolic figured 20-inch primary mirror and a 7.25-inch secondary mirror – both conical shaped, made of lightweight, low-expansion ceramic – an OGS140 equatorial fork mount, and a computer control system.

The Baton Rouge Astronomical Society, also known as B.R.A.S., was founded in 1981 as a non-profit organization. Volunteer members of this organization meet monthly at the Highland Road Park Observatory. The society is a member organization of the Astronomical League, members volunteer in support of operation of the Highland Road Park Observatory and conduct many outreach activities including sidewalk astronomy and dark sky advocacy.

== Discoveries ==
Minor planets discovered: 1
(91239) 1999 CA_{10}	15 February 1999	list

More than 40 numbered minor planets have been discovered at the Highland Road Park Observatory since 1998. The Minor Planet Center credits these discoveries to the astronomers Walter R. Cooney Jr., Matthew Collier, Patrick M. Motl, Susannah Lazar, Katrina Wefel, Terry Martin, Merrill Hess, Geoffrey Burks, Ethan Kandler and Meredith Howard. One minor planet is directly credited to the observatory (see table).

The outer main-belt asteroid 11739 Baton Rouge, discovered by Walter R. Cooney Jr. in 1998, is named for the Louisiana state capital, where the discovering observatory is located.

== See also ==
- Landolt Astronomical Observatory
- List of asteroid-discovering observatories
- List of astronomical observatories
- List of minor planet discoverers § Discovering dedicated institutions
- List of observatory codes
