= Karl Urban (aviator) =

Austro-Hungarian aviator (1894–1918)

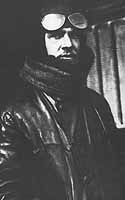
- Born: 29 December 1894; Graz, Austria
- Died: 12 July 1918 (aged 23); Aspern, Vienna, Austria
- Military career
- Allegiance: Austro-Hungarian Empire
- Branch: Austro-Hungarian Aviation Troops
- Rank: Offiziersstellvertreter (Deputy Officer)
- Units: Fliegerkompanie 10; Fliegerkompanie 27; Fliegerkompanie 66D; Fliegerkompanie 14
- Awards: 1 gold and 3 silver awards of Medal for Bravery

Karl Urban (29 December 1894 – 12 July 1918) was an Austro-Hungarian World War I flying ace credited with five aerial victories.

Urban joined the Austro-Hungarian military as war broke out in 1914, volunteering for pilot's school as soon as he finished recruit training. In mid-July 1915, he was posted to the Russian Front as an aerial reconnaissance and bombing pilot. Between 15 May and 2 August 1916, Urban and his various observers—including Otto Jäger—were credited with four victories. On 28 August 1916, Urban was severely wounded in action but, after recovering, progressed to flying a Phönix D.I, gaining his fifth and final victory on 19 May 1918.

Transferred to test pilot duty, Urban was looping a new model Phönix D.I on 12 July 1918, when it shed its wings at 1,500 meters altitude. The subsequent crash killed him.

== Early life and service ==
Karl Urban was born in Graz, Austria on 29 December 1894, when it was still part of the Austro-Hungarian Empire. When World War I began, he was one of many who rushed into military service. He completed basic training, then volunteered for aviation duty. He was sent to pilot's training with Fliegerersatzkompanie 6 in Fischamend.

== Aerial reconnaissance duty ==
In mid-July 1915, the newly trained pilot received his first flying assignment. He reported to Fliegerkompanie 10 on the Russian Front; it was commanded by Hauptmann (Captain) Erich Kahlen. Flik 10 was not a specialized unit; it operated predominantly two-seater aircraft, such as Hansa-Brandenburg C.Is and Knoller-Albatros B.Is. Their flights were for reconnaissance, artillery direction, and aerial photography. Urban's development of his natural abilities as a pilot soon had him acknowledged as the squadron's most skillful flier.

On 1 September 1915, Urban was dubbed a "Field Pilot". On 28 September, he and his observer had gathered military intelligence of great value while flying a reconnaissance mission. When the machine's engine quit north of Klevan, Urban managed to glide back and perform a deadstick landing, joining friendly forces near Torczyn.

On 22 December, while flying over Rowno, he suffered another engine stoppage. While still in flight, he climbed forward, unstuck the engine's valve train, and restarted the motor for the trip home. A week later, he received Austrian Pilot Certificate number 306.

Urban was awarded his Field Pilot's Badge on 22 February 1916. During March 1916, he was also awarded the Silver Medal for Bravery First Class.

On the 26th, he once again pulled off a daring raid on Klewan's railroad depot. He and his aerial observer, Oberleutnant Grunne, bombed the depot after penetrating heavy cloud cover and extensive anti-aircraft fire; on the way home, they spotted a previously unknown Russian airfield.

== Aerial victories ==
On the morning of 5 May 1916, Urban and Otto Jäger, his aerial observer, engaged a Russian aircraft with a crew of three, possibly a Sikorsky. During a prolonged battle of more than 25 minutes, Jäger fired 300 shots at the Russians before his machine gun jammed. Urban then fired with a carbine while his gunner cleared the jam. Jäger then reopened fire, and drove the Russian plane down just within its own lines. When friendly infantry verified the downing, Urban had his first aerial victory.

On 7 June 1916, Urban and Jäger scored a second victory together. The two of them cooperated with another Austro-Hungarian aircrew in driving down a pair of Russian Farman biplanes; each Austro-Hungarian crew was credited with a victory. On 2 August, Jäger and Urban scored again, when the gunner used 100 rounds of ammunition to shoot down a Farman two-seater behind Russian lines; the fatal victory was later confirmed through interrogation of Russian prisoners of war. On 28 August 1916, flying with a new observer, Urban engaged four Russian planes–three Farman two-seaters and a single-seater Nieuport fighter. The efforts to fight them off took the Austro-Hungarians down into range of enemy antiaircraft fire. As the Austro-Hungarians bucked a headwind from the north, their craft was rocked by a near-miss. Shrapnel slashed into Urban's back, knocking him out. Observer Bastyr restarted the engine, then roused Urban. The latter managed to struggle back to base and was sent to hospital. His heroism was rewarded with a personal written commendation. In September, he was awarded his empire's highest honor, the Gold Medal for Braver.y

== Service in fighter aircraft ==
In December 1916, Urban switched to Fliegerkompanie 27. On 22 February 1917, he was granted the rare distinction of being permanently awarded the Field Pilot's Badge. Halfway through October 1917, he was reassigned again, this time to an artillery direction unit on the Italian Front that later developed into Fliegerkompanie 66D. He would serve with them until the following Spring. Then he was posted to a fighter unit, Fliegerkompanie 14. His Phönix D.I fighter was marked with his initial 'U' in white on a red background band wrapped around the fuselage aft of the cockpit. He used this plane for his final victory; during a general engagement, on his first fighter sortie, on 19 May 1918, he downed an Italian Hanriot HD.1 fighter.

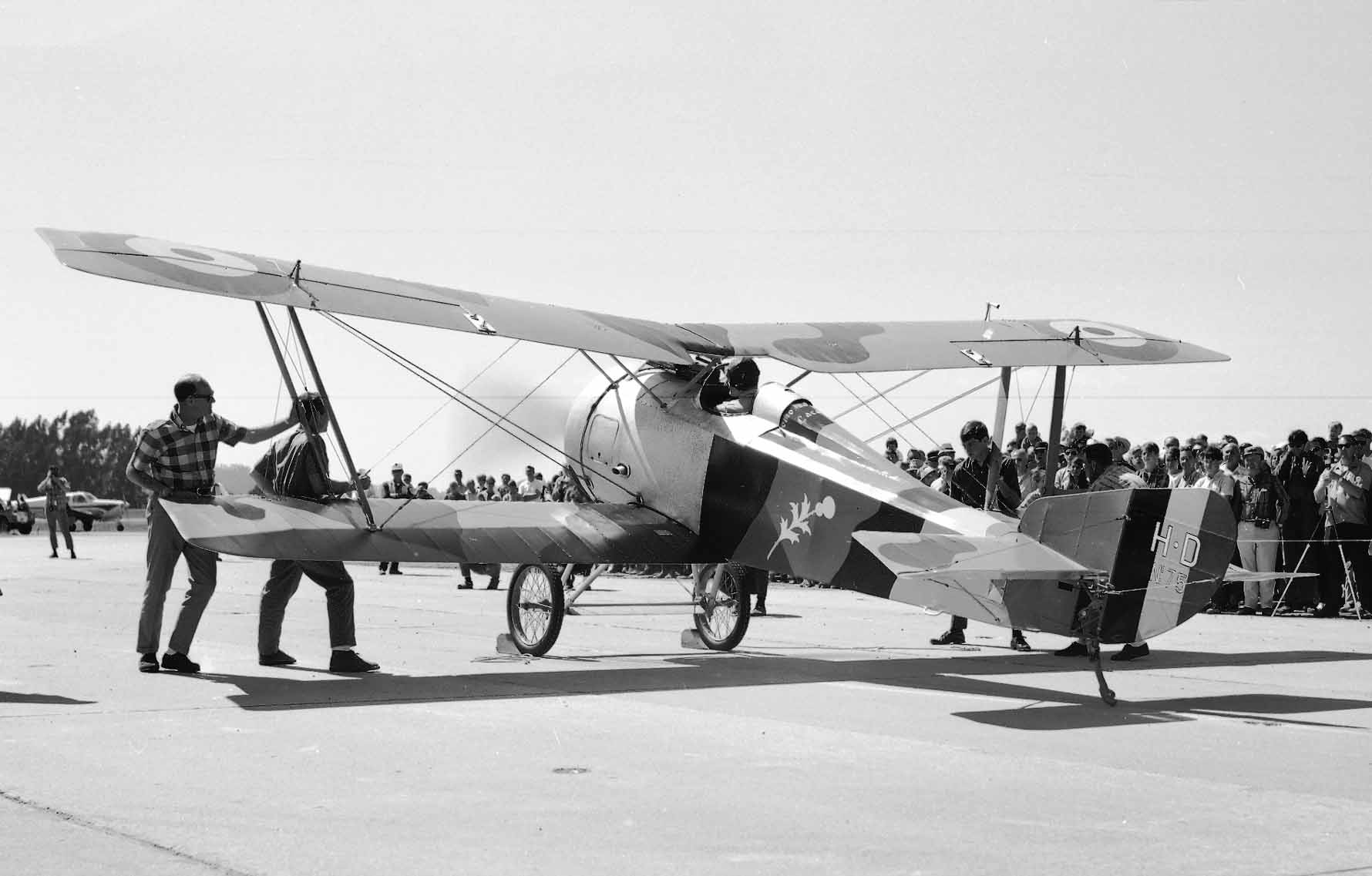
An Italian Hanriot HD-1 was Karl Urban's fifth victim.

== Death ==
Relieved from combat duty during July 1918, Urban became a test pilot. A session for evaluating new aircraft was scheduled for 9–13 July at Aspern Airfield near Vienna. On 12 July 1918, while looping at 1,500 meters, Urban's new model Phönix D.I lost its wings and he died in the crash. A week later, he was posthumously promoted to Austria-Hungary's highest noncommissioned officer rank, Offiziersstellvertreter (Deputy Officer).
