= Spectral flux density =

Electromagnetic energy transfer rate

In spectroscopy, spectral flux density is the quantity that describes the rate at which energy is transferred by electromagnetic radiation through a real or virtual surface, per unit surface area and per unit wavelength (or, equivalently, per unit frequency). It is a radiometric rather than a photometric measure. In SI units it is measured in W m^{−3}, although it can be more practical to use W m^{−2} nm^{−1} (1 W m^{−2} nm^{−1} = 1 GW m^{−3} = 1 W mm^{−3}) or W m^{−2} μm^{−1} (1 W m^{−2} μm^{−1} = 1 MW m^{−3}), and respectively by W·m^{−2}·Hz^{−1}, Jansky or solar flux units. The terms irradiance, radiant exitance, radiant emittance, and radiosity are closely related to spectral flux density.

The terms used to describe spectral flux density vary between fields, sometimes including adjectives such as "electromagnetic" or "radiative", and sometimes dropping the word "density". Applications include:

- Characterizing remote telescopically unresolved sources such as stars, observed from a specified observation point such as an observatory on earth.
- Characterizing a natural electromagnetic radiative field at a point, measured there with an instrument that collects radiation from a whole sphere or hemisphere of remote sources.
- Characterizing an artificial collimated electromagnetic radiative beam.

A related quantity, equivalent power flux density (EPFD), extends the concept to evaluate the cumulative interference produced by multiple transmitting satellites over time.

== Flux density received from an unresolvable "point source" ==
For the flux density received from a remote unresolvable "point source", the measuring instrument, usually telescopic, though not able to resolve any detail of the source itself, must be able to optically resolve enough details of the sky around the point source, so as to record radiation coming from it only, uncontaminated by radiation from other sources. In this case, spectral flux density is the quantity that describes the rate at which energy transferred by electromagnetic radiation is received from that unresolved point source, per unit receiving area facing the source, per unit wavelength range.

At any given wavelength λ, the spectral flux density, F_{λ}, can be determined by the following procedure:

- An appropriate detector of cross-sectional area 1 m^{2} is pointed directly at the source of the radiation.
- A narrow band-pass filter is placed in front of the detector so that only radiation whose wavelength lies within a very narrow range, Δλ, centred on λ, reaches the detector.
- The rate at which EM energy is detected by the detector is measured.
- This measured rate is then divided by Δλ to obtain the detected power per square metre per unit wavelength range.

Spectral flux density is often used as the quantity on the y-axis of a graph representing the spectrum of a light-source, such as a star.

== Flux density of the radiative field at a measuring point ==
There are two main approaches to definition of the spectral flux density at a measuring point in an electromagnetic radiative field. One may be conveniently here labelled the 'vector approach', the other the 'scalar approach'. The vector definition refers to the full spherical integral of the spectral radiance (also known as the specific radiative intensity or specific intensity) at the point, while the scalar definition refers to the many possible hemispheric integrals of the spectral radiance (or specific intensity) at the point. The vector definition seems to be preferred for theoretical investigations of the physics of the radiative field. The scalar definition seems to be preferred for practical applications.

=== Vector definition of flux density - 'full spherical flux density' ===
The vector approach defines flux density as a vector at a point of space and time prescribed by the investigator. To distinguish this approach, one might speak of the 'full spherical flux density'. In this case, nature tells the investigator what is the magnitude, direction, and sense of the flux density at the prescribed point. For the flux density vector, one may write

$$\mathbf{F}(\mathbf{x}, t;\nu) = \oint_\Omega\ I(\mathbf{x}, t;\mathbf{\hat{n}},\nu) \,\mathbf{\hat{n}} \,d\omega(\mathbf{\hat{n}})$$

where $I(\mathbf{x}, t;\mathbf{\hat{n}},\nu)$ denotes the spectral radiance (or specific intensity) at the point $\mathbf{x}$ at time $t$ and frequency $\nu\!$, $\mathbf{\hat{n}}$ denotes a variable unit vector with origin at the point $\mathbf{x}$, $d\omega(\mathbf{\hat{n}})$ denotes an element of solid angle around $\mathbf{\hat{n}}$, and $\Omega$ indicates that the integration extends over the full range of solid angles of a sphere.

Mathematically, defined as an unweighted integral over the solid angle of a full sphere, the flux density is the first moment of the spectral radiance (or specific intensity) with respect to solid angle. It is not common practice to make the full spherical range of measurements of the spectral radiance (or specific intensity) at the point of interest, as is needed for the mathematical spherical integration specified in the strict definition; the concept is nevertheless used in theoretical analysis of radiative transfer.

As described below, if the direction of the flux density vector is known in advance because of a symmetry, namely that the radiative field is uniformly layered and flat, then the vector flux density can be measured as the 'net flux', by algebraic summation of two oppositely sensed scalar readings in the known direction, perpendicular to the layers.

At a given point in space, in a steady-state field, the vector flux density, a radiometric quantity, is equal to the time-averaged Poynting vector, an electromagnetic field quantity.

Within the vector approach to the definition, however, there are several specialized sub-definitions. Sometimes the investigator is interested only in a specific direction, for example the vertical direction referred to a point in a planetary or stellar atmosphere, because the atmosphere there is considered to be the same in every horizontal direction, so that only the vertical component of the flux is of interest. Then the horizontal components of flux are considered to cancel each other by symmetry, leaving only the vertical component of the flux as non-zero. In this case some astrophysicists think in terms of the astrophysical flux (density), which they define as the vertical component of the flux (of the above general definition) divided by the number π. And sometimes the astrophysicist uses the term Eddington flux to refer to the vertical component of the flux (of the above general definition) divided by the number 4π.

=== Scalar definition of flux density - 'hemispheric flux density' ===
The scalar approach defines flux density as a scalar-valued function of a direction and sense in space prescribed by the investigator at a point prescribed by the investigator. Sometimes this approach is indicated by the use of the term 'hemispheric flux'. For example, an investigator of thermal radiation, emitted from the material substance of the atmosphere, received at the surface of the earth, is interested in the vertical direction, and the downward sense in that direction. This investigator thinks of a unit area in a horizontal plane, surrounding the prescribed point. The investigator wants to know the total power of all the radiation from the atmosphere above in every direction, propagating with a downward sense, received by that unit area. For the flux density scalar for the prescribed direction and sense, we may write

$$F(\mathbf{x}, t;\nu) = \int_{\Omega^{^+}} I(\mathbf{x}, t;\mathbf{\hat{n}},\nu) \,\cos \,(\theta(\mathbf{\hat{n}})) \,d\omega(\mathbf{\hat{n}})$$

where with the notation above, $\Omega^{^+}$ indicates that the integration extends only over the solid angles of the relevant hemisphere, and $\theta(\mathbf{\hat{n}})$ denotes the angle between $\mathbf{\hat{n}}$ and the prescribed direction. The term $\cos \,(\theta(\mathbf{\hat{n}}))$ is needed on account of Lambert's law. Mathematically, the quantity $F(\mathbf{x}, t;\nu)$ is not a vector because it is a positive scalar-valued function of the prescribed direction and sense, in this example, of the downward vertical. In this example, when the collected radiation is propagating in the downward sense, the detector is said to be "looking upwards". The measurement can be made directly with an instrument (such as a pyrgeometer) that collects the measured radiation all at once from all the directions of the imaginary hemisphere; in this case, Lambert-cosine-weighted integration of the spectral radiance (or specific intensity) is not performed mathematically after the measurement; the Lambert-cosine-weighted integration has been performed by the physical process of measurement itself.

==== Net flux ====
In a flat horizontal uniformly layered radiative field, the hemispheric fluxes, upwards and downwards, at a point, can be subtracted to yield what is often called the net flux. The net flux then has a value equal to the magnitude of the full spherical flux vector at that point, as described above.

=== Comparison between vector and scalar definitions of flux density ===
The radiometric description of the electromagnetic radiative field at a point in space and time is completely represented by the spectral radiance (or specific intensity) at that point. In a region in which the material is uniform and the radiative field is isotropic and homogeneous, let the spectral radiance (or specific intensity) be denoted by I (x, t ; r_{1}, ν), a scalar-valued function of its arguments x, t, r_{1}, and ν, where r_{1} denotes a unit vector with the direction and sense of the geometrical vector r from the source point P_{1} to the detection point P_{2}, where x denotes the coordinates of P_{1}, at time t and wave frequency ν. Then, in the region, I (x, t ; r_{1}, ν) takes a constant scalar value, which we here denote by I. In this case, the value of the vector flux density at P_{1} is the zero vector, while the scalar or hemispheric flux density at P_{1} in every direction in both senses takes the constant scalar value πI. The reason for the value πI is that the hemispheric integral is half the full spherical integral, and the integrated effect of the angles of incidence of the radiation on the detector requires a halving of the energy flux according to Lambert's cosine law; the solid angle of a sphere is 4π.

The vector definition is suitable for the study of general radiative fields. The scalar or hemispheric spectral flux density is convenient for discussions in terms of the two-stream model of the radiative field, which is reasonable for a field that is uniformly stratified in flat layers, when the base of the hemisphere is chosen to be parallel to the layers, and one or other sense (up or down) is specified. In an inhomogeneous non-isotropic radiative field, the spectral flux density defined as a scalar-valued function of direction and sense contains much more directional information than does the spectral flux density defined as a vector, but the full radiometric information is customarily stated as the spectral radiance (or specific intensity).

== Collimated beam ==
For the present purposes, the light from a star, and for some particular purposes, the light of the sun, can be treated as a practically collimated beam, but apart from this, a collimated beam is rarely if ever found in nature, though artificially produced beams can be very nearly collimated. The spectral radiance (or specific intensity) is suitable for the description of an uncollimated radiative field. The integrals of spectral radiance (or specific intensity) with respect to solid angle, used above, are singular for exactly collimated beams, or may be viewed as Dirac delta functions. Therefore, the specific radiative intensity is unsuitable for the description of a collimated beam, while spectral flux density is suitable for that purpose. At a point within a collimated beam, the spectral flux density vector has a value equal to the Poynting vector, a quantity defined in the classical Maxwell theory of electromagnetic radiation.

== Relative spectral flux density ==
Sometimes it is more convenient to display graphical spectra with vertical axes that show the relative spectral flux density. In this case, the spectral flux density at a given wavelength is expressed as a fraction of some arbitrarily chosen reference value. Relative spectral flux densities are expressed as pure numbers without any units.

Spectra showing the relative spectral flux density are used when we are interested in comparing the spectral flux densities of different sources; for example, if we want to show how the spectra of blackbody sources vary with absolute temperature, it is not necessary to show the absolute values. The relative spectral flux density is also useful if we wish to compare a source's flux density at one wavelength with the same source's flux density at another wavelength; for example, if we wish to demonstrate how the Sun's spectrum peaks in the visible part of the EM spectrum, a graph of the Sun's relative spectral flux density will suffice.

== See also ==
- Radiative flux
