= Photometric-standard star =

Stars that have had their light output measured carefully

Photometric-standard stars are a series of stars that have had their light output in various passbands of photometric system measured very carefully. Other objects can be observed using CCD cameras or photoelectric photometers connected to a telescope, and the flux, or amount of light received, can be compared to a photometric-standard star to determine the exact brightness, or stellar magnitude, of the object.

A current set of photometric-standard stars for UBVRI photometry was published by Arlo U. Landolt in 1992 in The Astronomical Journal.

== See also ==
- Light curve – Graph of light intensity of a celestial object or region, as a function of time
- Standard candle – Class of astronomical object of known luminosity
