= Otto Jäger =

Austro-Hungarian flying ace

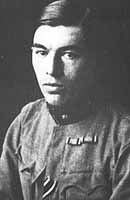
- Otto Jäger
- Born: 6 April 1894; Aš, Bohemia
- Died: 19 August 1917 (aged 23); Italy
- Military career
- Allegiance: Austro-Hungarian Empire
- Branch: Austro-Hungarian Army; Austro-Hungarian Aviation Troops
- Service years: 1914–1917
- Rank: Oberleutnant
- Units: Fliegerkompanie 10; Fliegerkompanie 17; Fliegerkompanie 3; Fliegerkompanie 27; Fliegerkompanie 42J
- Conflicts: World War I; Eastern Front; Italian front; Battles of the Isonzo †
- Awards: Order of the Iron Crown; Military Merit Cross; Military Merit Medal; Medal for Bravery; German Iron Cross

Oberleutnant Otto Jäger (6 April 1894 – 19 August 1917) was an Austro-Hungarian World War I flying ace credited with seven aerial victories. He entered the war in 1914 as an infantry officer. By mid-1915, he had suffered three serious wounds fighting on the Russian Front, winning the Military Merit Medal, Silver Medal for Bravery, and the German War Service Medal. Invalided from front line service to training duties, Jäger trained as an aerial observer. Posted back to the Russian Front to fly with Fliegerkompanie 10 (Flik 10) in early 1916, Jäger scored his fifth victory on 2 August 1916. He was awarded the Silver Military Merit Medal, the Military Merit Cross, and the German Iron Cross Second Class.

After training as a pilot for the rest of 1916, Jäger returned to the Russian Front to score his sixth victory on 20 July 1917. He was then transferred to a fighter squadron in Italy, where he shot down an Italian Nieuport on 19 August 1917. Shortly thereafter, Otto Jäger was shot down and killed by another Nieuport. He was then awarded his highest honor, the Order of the Iron Crown.

== Childhood and early military service ==
Otto Jäger was born to Sudeten German parents on 6 April 1894 in Aš, West Bohemia in the Austro-Hungarian Empire. He attended the State Trade School. In 1909, he performed his obligatory military service, finishing as a Fahnrich (Ensign). When the First World War began, he returned to serve in Hungarian Regiment No. 67 when it went into action on the Russian Front. He was severely wounded on 30 August 1914. He was commissioned as an officer on 1 November 1914.

Jäger was wounded twice during early 1915. On 21 March, he suffered a serious chest wound. He rushed his return to duty from hospital, only to be shot through the lung on 17 May. This third wound left him unfit for infantry combat duty. Austria-Hungary awarded Jäger the Bronze Military Merit Medal and the Silver Medal for Bravery, First Class. Prussia presented him with its War Service Medal.

Invalided from the front lines, Jäger was posted to a training position. He promptly volunteered for the Austro-Hungarian Aviation Troops. He reported to Officers Flight School in Wiener-Neustadt for training as an observer and technical officer.

== Service as an aerial observer ==
In Spring 1916, Jäger was posted back to the Russian Front, to Fliegerkompanie 10 (Flik 10), in the dual roles of technical officer and aerial observer. He was manning the observer's rear gun for Karl Urban in an Albatros B.I at 0900 hours on 5 May 1916, when he was credited with his first aerial victory near Koryto. He was credited with forcing a "large Russian battleplane" to land just behind enemy lines; his victim may have been either a Farman or a Sikorsky. His second victory came at 0700 hours on 3 June, near Stephan, a Farman. He was one of two observers whose machine gun fire forced the enemy to land behind Russian lines.

On 7 June, once again piloted by Urban, Jäger forced down another Farman at 0730 hours, and still another five minutes later. Both planes made emergency landings behind Russian lines, one in the vicinity of Ostrosez, the other near Olyka.

On 2 August 1916, Jäger and Urban were flying a morning patrol in a Hansa-Brandenburg C.I when they destroyed a Sikorsky bomber east of Szelwow. Russian prisoners of war would later confirm the death of the Russian aircrew.

Jäger was now an ace, and had the medals to prove it—the Silver Military Merit Medal, the Military Merit Cross Third Class with War Decorations and Swords, and the Prussian Iron Cross Second Class.

== Service as a fighter pilot ==
In September 1916, Jäger was accepted for pilot training. He qualified as a pilot in December; he received the Austrian Pilot's Certificate No. 562 on the 19th. In March 1917, he was posted to Fliegerkompanie 3 (Flik 3) on the Russian Front. Shortly thereafter, he was posted onward to Fliegerkompanie 17 (Flik 17), also on the Russian Front, as a reconnaissance pilot in two-seat aircraft. On 2 May 1917, he suffered a freak ground accident when he was wounded in the legs by a spinning propeller. It took him until July to recover. He was then posted to Fliegerkompanie 27 (Flik 27) on the Russian Front. Flik 27 had Albatros D.IIIs on strength along with its two-seaters. Jäger used one of the Albatros fighters to down an enemy two-seater near Brzezany on 20 July 1917.

With this proof of ability, Jäger was sent to a dedicated fighter squadron, Fliegerkompanie 42J (Flik 42J), on the Italian Front. Flik 42J was stationed at Sesana Airfield east of Trieste, and operated on the Isonzo Front. On 19 August 1917, he shot down a two-seated Nieuport. Later in this same dogfight, Jäger came under fire from a second Nieuport. The wings of Jäger's Albatros D.III collapsed from damage, and he plummeted to his death. After his death, he was posthumously awarded the Order of the Iron Crown Emperor Karl I.
