= The Flicks Community Movie Houses =

The Flicks is an independent community movie theater based in Phnom Penh, Cambodia, notable for being the city's first independent art house cinema venue. Founded in 2009, the business operated multiple locations before permanently closing in 2021. A fundraiser in June 2026 made it possible to reopen a new theater at a new location in September of the same year.

== History ==
The theater was established in 2009 by Martin and Jeanette Robinson from New Zealand, who converted a pre-Khmer Rouge era villa into an air-conditioned screening room and bar. In March 2011, Dutch entrepreneur Ramon Stoppelenburg assumed ownership of the business following a public fundraising campaign intended to prevent the theater's closure.

Following the global impact of the COVID-19 pandemic on the independent film industry, the final venue operated by The Flicks closed on August 8, 2021.

The organization is a founding member of the Motion Picture Association of Cambodia (MPAC) and maintains a practice of registering screening titles with the Cambodian Department of Cinema & Cultural Diffusion.

== Screening policy ==
The Flicks pays the proper screening fees directly to the production company or distributor for a limited, agreed number of screenings and has a blanked license to screen vintage classics and hits from a decade or more ago, using specific permission from foreign distributors backed by an official legal permit.

Their programming relies on a multi-tiered legal and cooperative framework:

- Cultural Embassy & Institutional Partnerships: They collaborate closely with cultural missions — including the Institut Français Cambodge, the Goethe-Institut, and the Embassy of the Kingdom of the Netherlands (in Bangkok). Through these partnerships, they screen culturally significant foreign-language films, retrospective pieces, and documentaries that promote global artistic exchange.
- Independent Licenses: Their broader contemporary and library selections operate under specialized international independent movie license umbrellas. This allows their community movie theater environment to legally screen curated titles that fall outside traditional and recent commercial distribution windows.
- Direct Studio & Filmmaker Consent: The Flicks believes in supporting creators. For new releases and special independent features, they reach out directly to production studios and filmmakers. For example with their screenings of The Last Reel (director Kulikar Sotho), Becoming Human (Anti-Archive Films), City of Ghosts (Mainline Productions), Cambodian Son (Producers Anida Yoeu Ali and Masahiro Sugano), Don’t Think I’ve Forgotten (CAT&Docs) and NAZA (mk2 Films). By obtaining explicit consent and arranging localized screening fees, they ensure that artists are respected and that the little theater remains 100% compliant.

== Notable venues ==
Over its period of operation, The Flicks expanded to include several distinct locations:

- The Flicks 2:

Opened in April 2012 at #89, Street 136, inside the 11 Happy Backpackers Hostel. The venue had a seating capacity of 20 and screened films daily, including The Killing Fields. It ceased operations in December 2017.

- The Flicks 3:

Opened in August 2014 at #8, Street 258, between Wat Botum Park and the Hotel Cambodiana. This location featured a seating capacity of 30 and integrated a restaurant, cocktail bar, and guesthouse. It closed in December 2017 and has since been the location of The Box Office.
