= AB magnitude =

Astronomical magnitude system

The AB magnitude system is an astronomical magnitude system. Unlike many other magnitude systems, it is based on flux measurements that are calibrated in absolute units, namely spectral flux densities.

== Definition ==
The monochromatic AB magnitude is defined as the logarithm of a spectral flux density with the usual scaling of astronomical magnitudes and a zero-point of about 3631 janskys (symbol Jy), where 1 Jy = 10^{−26} W Hz^{−1} m^{−2} = 10^{−23} erg s^{−1} Hz^{−1} cm^{−2} ("about" because the true definition of the zero point is based on magnitudes as shown below). If the spectral flux density is denoted f_{ν}, the monochromatic AB magnitude is:

$$m_\text{AB} \approx -2.5 \log_{10} \left(\frac{f_{\nu}}{\mathrm{3631\,Jy}}\right),$$

or, with f_{ν} still in janskys,

$$m_\text{AB} = -2.5 \log_{10} f_{\nu} + 8.90.$$

The exact definition is stated relative to the cgs units of erg s^{−1} cm^{−2} Hz^{−1}:

$$m_\text{AB} = -2.5 \log_{10} f_{\nu} - 48.60.$$

Inverting this leads to the true definition of the numerical value "3631 Jy" often cited:

$$f_{\nu,0} = 10^{\tfrac{48.60}{-2.5}} \approx 3.631 \times 10^{-20} \mathrm{erg\, {cm}^{-2}}$$

Actual measurements are always made across some continuous range of wavelengths. The bandpass AB magnitude is defined so that the zero point corresponds to a bandpass-averaged spectral flux density of about 3631 Jy:

$$m_\text{AB} \approx  -2.5 \log_{10} \left(\frac{\int f_\nu {(h\nu)}^{-1} e(\nu)\, \mathrm{d}\nu}{\int \mathrm{3631 \, Jy} \, {(h\nu)}^{-1} e(\nu) \, \mathrm{d}\nu}\right),$$

where e(ν) is the "equal-energy" filter response function and the (hν)^{−1} term assumes that the detector is a photon-counting device such as a CCD or photomultiplier.

Filter responses are sometimes expressed as quantum efficiencies q(ν), that is, in terms of their response per photon, rather than per unit energy. In those cases the (hν)^{−1} term has been folded into the definition of q(ν), yielding:

$$m_\text{AB} \approx  -2.5 \log_{10} \left(\frac{\int f_\nu\, q(\nu)\, \mathrm{d}\nu}{\int \mathrm{3631 \, Jy} \, q(\nu) \, \mathrm{d}\nu}\right),$$

The STMAG system is similarly defined, but for constant flux per unit wavelength interval instead.

AB stands for "absolute" in the sense that no relative reference object is used (unlike using Vega as a baseline object). This must not be confused with absolute magnitude in the sense of the apparent brightness of an object if seen from a distance of 10 parsecs.

== Expression in terms of f_{λ} ==
In some fields, spectral flux densities are expressed per unit wavelength, f_{λ}, rather than per unit frequency, f_{ν}. At any specific wavelength,

$$f_\nu = \frac{\lambda^2}{c} f_\lambda,$$

where f_{ν} is measured per frequency (say, in hertz), and f_{λ} is measured per wavelength (say, in centimeters). If the wavelength unit is ångströms,

$$\frac{f_\nu}{\text{Jy}} = 3.34 \times 10^4 \left(\frac{\lambda}{\AA}\right)^2 \frac{f_\lambda}{\mathrm{erg \, {cm}^{-2} \, s^{-1} \, \AA^{-1}}}.$$

This can then be plugged into the equations above.

The "pivot wavelength" of a given bandpass is the value of λ that makes the above conversion exact for observations made in that bandpass. For an equal-energy response function as defined above, it is

$$\lambda_\text{piv} = \sqrt{\frac{\int e(\lambda) \lambda\, \mathrm{d}\lambda}{\int e(\lambda) \lambda^{-1}\, \mathrm{d}\lambda}}.$$

For a response function expressed in the quantum-efficiency convention, it is:

$$\lambda_\text{piv} = \sqrt{\frac{\int e(\lambda)\, \mathrm{d}\lambda}{\int e(\lambda) \lambda^{-2}\, \mathrm{d}\lambda}}.$$

== Conversion from other magnitude systems ==
Magnitudes in the AB system can be converted to other systems. However, because all magnitude systems involve integration of some assumed source spectrum over some assumed passband, such conversions are not necessarily trivial to calculate, and precise conversions depend on the actual bandpass of the observations in question. Various authors have computed conversions for standard situations.
