= Flick (physics) =

Unit of spectral radiance

In optical engineering and telecommunications engineering, the flick is a unit of spectral radiance. One flick corresponds to a spectral radiance of 1 watt per steradian per square centimeter of surface per micrometer of span in wavelength (W·sr^{−1}·cm^{−2}·μm^{−1}). This is equivalent to 10^{10} watts per steradian per cubic meter (W·sr^{−1}·m^{−3}). In practice, spectral radiance is typically measured in microflicks (10^{−6} flicks). One microflick is equivalent to 10 kilowatts per steradian per cubic meter (kW·sr^{−1}·m^{−3}).

== History ==
In radio astronomy, the unit flik was coined by a group at Lockheed in Palo Alto, California as a substitute for the SI derived unit W cm^{−2} sr^{−1} μm^{−1}, or watts divided by centimeters squared, steradians, and micrometers. While originally used only at Lockheed, many in the radio astronomy field adopted its use.
