= Spectral radiance =

Radiance of a surface

In radiometry, spectral radiance or specific intensity is the radiance of a surface per unit frequency or wavelength, depending on whether the spectrum is taken as a function of frequency or of wavelength. The SI unit of spectral radiance in frequency is the watt per steradian per square metre per hertz (W·sr^{−1}·m^{−2}·Hz^{−1}) and that of spectral radiance in wavelength is the watt per steradian per square metre per metre (W·sr^{−1}·m^{−3})—commonly the watt per steradian per square metre per nanometre (W·sr^{−1}·m^{−2}·nm^{−1}). The microflick is also used to measure spectral radiance in some fields.

Spectral radiance gives a full radiometric description of the field of classical electromagnetic radiation of any kind, including thermal radiation and light. It is conceptually distinct from the descriptions in explicit terms of Maxwellian electromagnetic fields or of photon distribution. It refers to material physics as distinct from psychophysics.

For the concept of specific intensity, the line of propagation of radiation lies in a semi-transparent medium which varies continuously in its optical properties. The concept refers to an area, projected from the element of source area into a plane at right angles to the line of propagation, and to an element of solid angle subtended by the detector at the element of source area.

The term brightness is also sometimes used for this concept. The SI system states that the word brightness should not be so used, but should instead refer only to psychophysics.

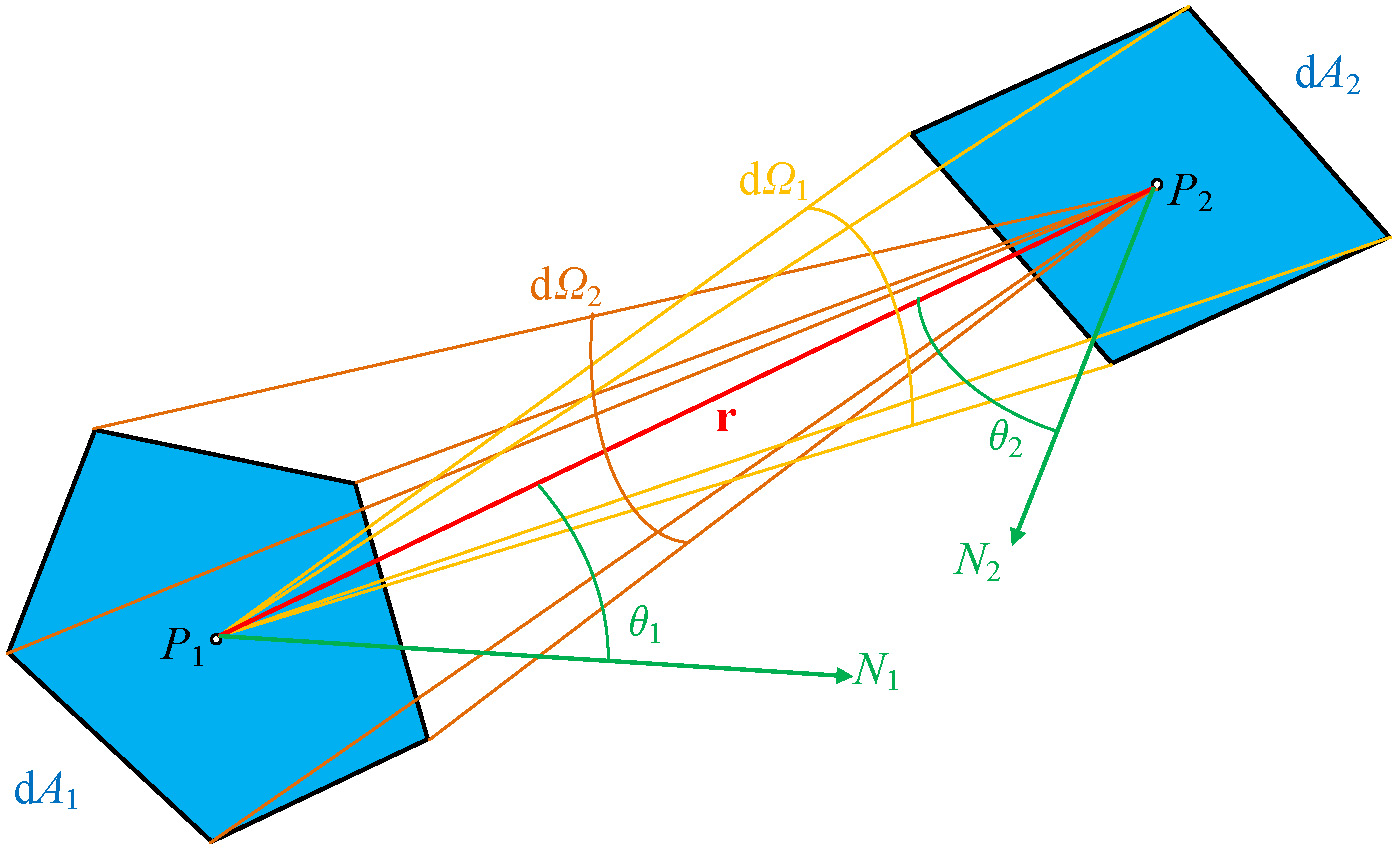
The geometry for the definition of specific (radiative) intensity. Note the potential in the geometry for laws of reciprocity.

== Definition ==
The specific (radiative) intensity is a quantity that describes the rate of radiative transfer of energy at P_{1}, a point of space with coordinates x, at time t. It is a scalar-valued function of four variables, customarily written as
$$I(\mathbf{x}, t; \mathbf{r}_1, \nu)$$
where:

- ν denotes frequency.
- r_{1} denotes a unit vector, with the direction and sense of the geometrical vector r in the line of propagation from
- the effective source point P_{1}, to
- a detection point P_{2}.

I (x, t ; r_{1}, ν) is defined to be such that a virtual source area, dA_{1}, containing the point P_{1} , is an apparent emitter of a small but finite amount of energy dE transported by radiation of frequencies (ν, ν + dν) in a small time duration dt , where
$$dE = I(\mathbf{x}, t; \mathbf{r}_1, \nu) \cos(\theta_1) \, dA_1 \, d\Omega_1 \, d\nu \, dt \, ,$$
and where θ_{1} is the angle between the line of propagation r and the normal P_{1}N_{1} to dA_{1}; the effective destination of dE is a finite small area dA_{2} , containing the point P_{2} , that defines a finite small solid angle dΩ_{1} about P_{1} in the direction of r. The cosine accounts for the projection of the source area dA_{1} into a plane at right angles to the line of propagation indicated by r.

The use of the differential notation for areas dA_{i} indicates they are very small compared to r^{2}, the square of the magnitude of vector r, and thus the solid angles dΩ_{i} are also small.

There is no radiation that is attributed to P_{1} itself as its source, because P_{1} is a geometrical point with no magnitude. A finite area is needed to emit a finite amount of light.

== Invariance ==
For propagation of light in a vacuum, the definition of specific (radiative) intensity implicitly allows for the inverse square law of radiative propagation. The concept of specific (radiative) intensity of a source at the point P_{1} presumes that the destination detector at the point P_{2} has optical devices (telescopic lenses and so forth) that can resolve the details of the source area dA_{1}. Then the specific radiative intensity of the source is independent of the distance from source to detector; it is a property of the source alone. This is because it is defined per unit solid angle, the definition of which refers to the area dA_{2} of the detecting surface.

This may be understood by looking at the diagram. The factor cos θ_{1} has the effect of converting the effective emitting area dA_{1} into a virtual projected area cos θ_{1} dA_{1} = r^{2} dΩ_{2} at right angles to the vector r from source to detector. The solid angle dΩ_{1} also has the effect of converting the detecting area dA_{2} into a virtual projected area cos θ_{2} dA_{2} = r^{2} dΩ_{1} at right angles to the vector r , so that dΩ_{1} = cos θ_{2} dA_{2} / r^{2} . Substituting this for dΩ_{1} in the above expression for the collected energy dE, one finds dE = I (x, t ; r_{1}, ν) cos θ_{1} dA_{1} cos θ_{2} dA_{2} dν dt / r^{2}: when the emitting and detecting areas and angles dA_{1} and dA_{2}, θ_{1} and θ_{2}, are held constant, the collected energy dE is inversely proportional to the square of the distance r between them, with invariant I (x, t ; r_{1}, ν) .

This may be expressed also by the statement that I (x, t ; r_{1}, ν) is invariant with respect to the length r of r ; that is to say, provided the optical devices have adequate resolution, and that the transmitting medium is perfectly transparent, as for example a vacuum, then the specific intensity of the source is unaffected by the length r of the ray r.

For the propagation of light in a transparent medium with a non-unit non-uniform refractive index, the invariant quantity along a ray is the specific intensity divided by the square of the absolute refractive index.

== Reciprocity ==
For the propagation of light in a semi-transparent medium, specific intensity is not invariant along a ray, because of absorption and emission. Nevertheless, the Stokes-Helmholtz reversion-reciprocity principle applies, because absorption and emission are the same for both senses of a given direction at a point in a stationary medium.

== Étendue and reciprocity ==
The term étendue is used to focus attention specifically on the geometrical aspects. The reciprocal character of étendue is indicated in the article about it. Étendue is defined as a second differential. In the notation of the present article, the second differential of the étendue, d^{2}G , of the pencil of light which "connects" the two surface elements dA_{1} and dA_{2} is defined as
$$d^2 G = dA_1 \cos(\theta_1) \, d\Omega_1 = \frac{dA_1 \, dA_2 \cos(\theta_1) \cos(\theta_2)}{r^2} = dA_2 \cos(\theta_2) \, d\Omega_2.$$

This can help understand the geometrical aspects of the Stokes-Helmholtz reversion-reciprocity principle.

== Collimated beam ==
For the present purposes, the light from a star can be treated as a practically collimated beam, but apart from this, a collimated beam is rarely if ever found in nature, though artificially produced beams can be very nearly collimated. For some purposes the rays of the sun can be considered as practically collimated, because the sun subtends an angle of only 32′ of arc. The specific (radiative) intensity is suitable for the description of an uncollimated radiative field. The integrals of specific (radiative) intensity with respect to solid angle, used for the definition of spectral flux density, are singular for exactly collimated beams, or may be viewed as Dirac delta functions. Therefore, the specific (radiative) intensity is unsuitable for the description of a collimated beam, while spectral flux density is suitable for that purpose.

== Rays ==
Specific (radiative) intensity is built on the idea of a pencil of rays of light.

In an optically isotropic medium, the rays are normals to the wavefronts, but in an optically anisotropic crystalline medium, they are in general at angles to those normals. That is to say, in an optically anisotropic crystal, the energy does not in general propagate at right angles to the wavefronts.

== Alternative approaches ==
The specific (radiative) intensity is a radiometric concept. Related to it is the intensity in terms of the photon distribution function, which uses the metaphor of a particle of light that traces the path of a ray.

The idea common to the photon and the radiometric concepts is that the energy travels along rays.

Another way to describe the radiative field is in terms of the Maxwell electromagnetic field, which includes the concept of the wavefront. The rays of the radiometric and photon concepts are along the time-averaged Poynting vector of the Maxwell field. In an anisotropic medium, the rays are not in general perpendicular to the wavefront.
