= Foot-lambert =

Unit of measurement for luminance

A foot-lambert or footlambert (fL, sometimes fl or ft-L) is a unit of luminance in United States customary units and some other unit systems. A foot-lambert equals 1/π or 0.3183 candela per square foot, or 3.426 candela per square meter (the corresponding SI unit). The foot-lambert is named after Johann Heinrich Lambert (1728–1777), a Swiss-German mathematician, physicist and astronomer. It is rarely used by electrical and lighting engineers, who prefer the candela per square foot or candela per square meter units.

The luminance of a perfect Lambertian diffuse reflecting surface in foot-lamberts is equal to the incident illuminance in foot-candles. For real diffuse reflectors, the ratio of luminance to illuminance in these units is roughly equal to the reflectance of the surface. Mathematically,
$$L_\mathrm v = E_\mathrm v \times R,$$
where

- $L_\mathrm v$ is the luminance, in foot-lamberts;
- $E_\mathrm v$ is the illuminance, in foot-candles; and
- $R$ is the reflectivity, expressed as a fractional number (for example, a grey card with 18% reflectivity would have $R = 0.18$).

The foot-lambert is used in the motion picture industry for measuring the luminance of images on a projection screen. The Society of Motion Picture and Television Engineers (SMPTE) recommended, in SMPTE 196M, a screen luminance of 16 foot-lamberts for commercial movie theaters, when measured "open-gate" (i.e. with no film in the projector). (Typical base density of 0.05 yields peak white of about 14 fL.) The current revision of SMPTE 196M specifies 55 candela per square meter (nits).

The foot-lambert is also used in the flight simulation industry to measure the highlight brightness of visual display systems. The minimum required highlight brightness varies based on the type and level of Flight Simulation Training Device (FSTD), but is generally 3–6 foot-lamberts for most devices qualified under Federal Aviation Administration (FAA) or Joint Aviation Authorities (JAA) regulations.

Military specifications for illuminated switches, panels, and displays, such as MIL-PRF-22885 and SAE AS7788, also require luminance measurements in foot-lamberts. Luminance levels can vary from hundreds of foot-lamberts for sunlight readable switch displays per MIL-PRF-22885 to only a few foot-lamberts in night conditions for panels in accordance with SAE AS7788.

Units of luminance
		cd/m^{2} (SI unit) ≡ nit ≡ lm/m^{2}/sr	stilb (sb) (CGS unit) ≡ cd/cm^{2}	apostilb (asb) ≡ blondel	bril	skot (sk)	lambert (L)	foot-lambert (fL) = 1 / π cd/ft^{2}
1 cd/m^{2}	=	1	10^{−4}	π ≈ 3.142	10^{7} π ≈ 3.142×10^{7}	10^{3} π ≈ 3.142×10^{3}	10^{−4} π ≈ 3.142×10^{−4}	0.3048^{2} π ≈ 0.2919
1 sb	=	10^{4}	1	10^{4} π ≈ 3.142×10^{4}	10^{11} π ≈ 3.142×10^{11}	10^{7} π ≈ 3.142×10^{7}	π ≈ 3.142	30.48^{2} π ≈ 2919
1 asb	=	1 / π ≈ 0.3183	10^{−4} / π ≈ 3.183×10^{−5}	1	10^{7}	10^{3}	10^{−4}	0.3048^{2} ≈ 0.09290
1 bril	=	10^{−7} / π ≈ 3.183×10^{−8}	10^{−11} / π ≈ 3.183×10^{−12}	10^{−7}	1	10^{−4}	10^{−11}	0.3048^{2}×10^{−7} ≈ 9.290×10^{−9}
1 sk	=	10^{−3} / π ≈ 3.183×10^{−4}	10^{−7} / π ≈ 3.183×10^{−8}	10^{−3}	10^{4}	1	10^{−7}	0.3048^{2}×10^{−3} ≈ 9.290×10^{−5}
1 L	=	10^{4} / π ≈ 3183	1 / π ≈ 0.3183	10^{4}	10^{11}	10^{7}	1	0.3048^{2}×10^{4} ≈ 929.0
1 fL	=	1 / 0.3048^{2} / π ≈ 3.426	1 / 30.48^{2} / π ≈ 3.426×10^{−4}	1 / 0.3048^{2} ≈ 10.76	10^{7} / 0.3048^{2} ≈ 1.076×10^{8}	10^{3} / 0.3048^{2} ≈ 1.076×10^{4}	10^{−4} / 0.3048^{2} ≈ 1.076×10^{−3}	1

== See also ==
Other units of luminance:

- Lambert (L)
- Nit (nit)
- Stilb (sb)
- Apostilb (asb)
- Blondel (blondel)
- Skot (sk)
- Bril (bril)

SI photometry quantities
Quantity		Unit		Dimension (Note: The symbols in this column denote dimensions; "L", "T" and "J" are for length, time and luminous intensity respectively, not the symbols for the units litre, tesla and joule.)	Notes
Name	Symbol (Note: Standards organizations recommend that photometric quantities be denoted with a subscript "v" (for "visual") to avoid confusion with radiometric or photon quantities. For example: USA Standard Letter Symbols for Illuminating Engineering USAS Z7.1-1967, Y10.18-1967)	Name	Symbol	Dimension	Notes
Luminous energy	Q_{v} (Note: Alternative symbols sometimes seen: W for luminous energy, P or F for luminous flux, and ρ for luminous efficacy of a source.)	lumen second	lm⋅s	T⋅J	The lumen second is sometimes called the talbot.
Luminous flux, luminous power	Φ_{v}	lumen (= candela steradian)	lm (= cd⋅sr)	J	Luminous energy per unit time
Luminous intensity	I_{v}	candela (= lumen per steradian)	cd (= lm/sr)	J	Luminous flux per unit solid angle
Luminance	L_{v}	candela per square metre	cd/m^{2} (= lm/(sr⋅m^{2}))	L^{−2}⋅J	Luminous flux per unit solid angle per unit projected source area. The candela per square metre is sometimes called the nit.
Illuminance	E_{v}	lux (= lumen per square metre)	lx (= lm/m^{2})	L^{−2}⋅J	Luminous flux incident on a surface
Luminous exitance, luminous emittance	M_{v}	lumen per square metre	lm/m^{2}	L^{−2}⋅J	Luminous flux emitted from a surface
Luminous exposure	H_{v}	lux second	lx⋅s	L^{−2}⋅T⋅J	Time-integrated illuminance
Luminous energy density	ω_{v}	lumen second per cubic metre	lm⋅s/m^{3}	L^{−3}⋅T⋅J	
Luminous efficacy (of radiation)	K	lumen per watt	lm/W	M^{−1}⋅L^{−2}⋅T^{3}⋅J	Ratio of luminous flux to radiant flux
Luminous efficacy (of a source)	η	lumen per watt	lm/W	M^{−1}⋅L^{−2}⋅T^{3}⋅J	Ratio of luminous flux to power consumption
Luminous efficiency, luminous coefficient	V			1	Luminous efficacy normalized by the maximum possible efficacy
See also: SI; Photometry; Radiometry
