= Skot (unit) =

Deprecated unit of luminance

Skot (symbol: sk) is an old and deprecated measurement unit of luminance, used for self-luminous objects (dark luminance). The term comes from Greek skotos, meaning "darkness".

== Overview ==
The skot to measure the dark luminance (Dunkelleuchtdichte) was introduced in 1940 by the German Lighting Society (Deutsche Lichttechnische Gesellschaft, LiTG) out of a necessity to describe the luminance of self-luminous objects, which differed so much from that of other objects that it was impractical to describe it using commonly used luminance values. Conversion factors for so called "scotopic stilb" (Skotopisches Stilb) depend on the spectral distribution of the light and were therefore redefined in 1948 by the International Commission on Illumination (Internationale Beleuchtungskommission, IBK) for a specific color temperature of 2042 K or 2046 K, the temperature of solidification of platinum. Before 1948, the definition was based on a temperature of 2360 K as emitted by a wolfram-vacuum lamp. At this temperature, 1 sk = 10^{−3} asb. The maximum allowed value is 10 skot to avoid the unit being used up into areas of mixed scotopic and photopic vision of the eye.

== Unit conversions ==
Units of luminance
		cd/m^{2} (SI unit) ≡ nit ≡ lm/m^{2}/sr	stilb (sb) (CGS unit) ≡ cd/cm^{2}	apostilb (asb) ≡ blondel	bril	skot (sk)	lambert (L)	foot-lambert (fL) = 1 / π cd/ft^{2}
1 cd/m^{2}	=	1	10^{−4}	π ≈ 3.142	10^{7} π ≈ 3.142×10^{7}	10^{3} π ≈ 3.142×10^{3}	10^{−4} π ≈ 3.142×10^{−4}	0.3048^{2} π ≈ 0.2919
1 sb	=	10^{4}	1	10^{4} π ≈ 3.142×10^{4}	10^{11} π ≈ 3.142×10^{11}	10^{7} π ≈ 3.142×10^{7}	π ≈ 3.142	30.48^{2} π ≈ 2,919
1 asb	=	1 / π ≈ 0.3183	10^{−4} / π ≈ 3.183×10^{−5}	1	10^{7}	10^{3}	10^{−4}	0.3048^{2} ≈ 0.0929
1 bril	=	10^{−7} / π ≈ 3.183×10^{−8}	10^{−11} / π ≈ 3.183×10^{−12}	10^{−7}	1	10^{−4}	10^{−11}	0.3048^{2}×10^{−7} ≈ 9.29×10^{−9}
1 sk	=	10^{−3} / π ≈ 3.183×10^{−4}	10^{−7} / π ≈ 3.183×10^{−8}	10^{−3}	10^{4}	1	10^{−7}	0.3048^{2}×10^{−3} ≈ 9.29×10^{−5}
1 L	=	10^{4} / π ≈ 3,183	1 / π ≈ 0.3183	10^{4}	10^{11}	10^{7}	1	0.3048^{2}×10^{4} ≈ 929
1 fL	=	1 / 0.3048^{2} / π ≈ 3.426	1 / 30.48^{2} / π ≈ 3.426×10^{−4}	1 / 0.3048^{2} ≈ 10.76	10^{7} / 0.3048^{2} ≈ 1.076×10^{8}	10^{3} / 0.3048^{2} ≈ 1.076×10^{4}	10^{−4} / 0.3048^{2} ≈ 1.076×10^{−3}	1

== See also ==
- Nox (unit) to measure the dark illuminance (Dunkelbeleuchtungsstärke)
- Purkinje effect
- Photometry (optics)
- Scotopic lux
- Scotopic vision

SI photometry quantities
Quantity		Unit		Dimension (Note: The symbols in this column denote dimensions; "L", "T" and "J" are for length, time and luminous intensity respectively, not the symbols for the units litre, tesla and joule.)	Notes
Name	Symbol (Note: Standards organizations recommend that photometric quantities be denoted with a subscript "v" (for "visual") to avoid confusion with radiometric or photon quantities. For example: USA Standard Letter Symbols for Illuminating Engineering USAS Z7.1-1967, Y10.18-1967)	Name	Symbol	Dimension	Notes
Luminous energy	Q_{v} (Note: Alternative symbols sometimes seen: W for luminous energy, P or F for luminous flux, and ρ for luminous efficacy of a source.)	lumen second	lm⋅s	T⋅J	The lumen second is sometimes called the talbot.
Luminous flux, luminous power	Φ_{v}	lumen (= candela steradian)	lm (= cd⋅sr)	J	Luminous energy per unit time
Luminous intensity	I_{v}	candela (= lumen per steradian)	cd (= lm/sr)	J	Luminous flux per unit solid angle
Luminance	L_{v}	candela per square metre	cd/m^{2} (= lm/(sr⋅m^{2}))	L^{−2}⋅J	Luminous flux per unit solid angle per unit projected source area. The candela per square metre is sometimes called the nit.
Illuminance	E_{v}	lux (= lumen per square metre)	lx (= lm/m^{2})	L^{−2}⋅J	Luminous flux incident on a surface
Luminous exitance, luminous emittance	M_{v}	lumen per square metre	lm/m^{2}	L^{−2}⋅J	Luminous flux emitted from a surface
Luminous exposure	H_{v}	lux second	lx⋅s	L^{−2}⋅T⋅J	Time-integrated illuminance
Luminous energy density	ω_{v}	lumen second per cubic metre	lm⋅s/m^{3}	L^{−3}⋅T⋅J	
Luminous efficacy (of radiation)	K	lumen per watt	lm/W	M^{−1}⋅L^{−2}⋅T^{3}⋅J	Ratio of luminous flux to radiant flux
Luminous efficacy (of a source)	η	lumen per watt	lm/W	M^{−1}⋅L^{−2}⋅T^{3}⋅J	Ratio of luminous flux to power consumption
Luminous efficiency, luminous coefficient	V			1	Luminous efficacy normalized by the maximum possible efficacy
See also: SI; Photometry; Radiometry
