= Bril (unit) =

Non-SI unit of luminance

The bril is an old, non-SI, unit of luminance. The SI unit of luminance is the candela per square metre.

1 bril is the equivalent of 10−7 / π ≈ 3.183×10−8 cd/m^{−2}.

== Unit conversions ==
Units of luminance
		cd/m^{2} (SI unit) ≡ nit ≡ lm/m^{2}/sr	stilb (sb) (CGS unit) ≡ cd/cm^{2}	apostilb (asb) ≡ blondel	bril	skot (sk)	lambert (L)	foot-lambert (fL) = 1 / π cd/ft^{2}
1 cd/m^{2}	=	1	10^{−4}	π ≈ 3.142	10^{7} π ≈ 3.142×10^{7}	10^{3} π ≈ 3.142×10^{3}	10^{−4} π ≈ 3.142×10^{−4}	0.3048^{2} π ≈ 0.2919
1 sb	=	10^{4}	1	10^{4} π ≈ 3.142×10^{4}	10^{11} π ≈ 3.142×10^{11}	10^{7} π ≈ 3.142×10^{7}	π ≈ 3.142	30.48^{2} π ≈ 2,919
1 asb	=	1 / π ≈ 0.3183	10^{−4} / π ≈ 3.183×10^{−5}	1	10^{7}	10^{3}	10^{−4}	0.3048^{2} ≈ 0.0929
1 bril	=	10^{−7} / π ≈ 3.183×10^{−8}	10^{−11} / π ≈ 3.183×10^{−12}	10^{−7}	1	10^{−4}	10^{−11}	0.3048^{2}×10^{−7} ≈ 9.29×10^{−9}
1 sk	=	10^{−3} / π ≈ 3.183×10^{−4}	10^{−7} / π ≈ 3.183×10^{−8}	10^{−3}	10^{4}	1	10^{−7}	0.3048^{2}×10^{−3} ≈ 9.29×10^{−5}
1 L	=	10^{4} / π ≈ 3,183	1 / π ≈ 0.3183	10^{4}	10^{11}	10^{7}	1	0.3048^{2}×10^{4} ≈ 929
1 fL	=	1 / 0.3048^{2} / π ≈ 3.426	1 / 30.48^{2} / π ≈ 3.426×10^{−4}	1 / 0.3048^{2} ≈ 10.76	10^{7} / 0.3048^{2} ≈ 1.076×10^{8}	10^{3} / 0.3048^{2} ≈ 1.076×10^{4}	10^{−4} / 0.3048^{2} ≈ 1.076×10^{−3}	1

SI photometry quantities
Quantity		Unit		Dimension (Note: The symbols in this column denote dimensions; "L", "T" and "J" are for length, time, and luminous intensity respectively, not the symbols for the units litre, tesla, and joule.)	Notes
Name	Symbol (Note: Standards organizations recommend that photometric quantities be denoted with a subscript "v" (for "visual") to avoid confusion with radiometric or photon quantities. For example: USA Standard Letter Symbols for Illuminating Engineering USAS Z7.1-1967, Y10.18-1967)	Name	Symbol	Dimension	Notes
Luminous energy	Q_{v} (Note: Alternative symbols sometimes seen: W for luminous energy, P or F for luminous flux, and ρ for luminous efficacy of a source.)	lumen second	lm⋅s	T⋅J	The lumen second is sometimes called the talbot.
Luminous flux, luminous power	Φ_{v}	lumen (= candela steradian)	lm (= cd⋅sr)	J	Luminous energy per unit time
Luminous intensity	I_{v}	candela (= lumen per steradian)	cd (= lm/sr)	J	Luminous flux per unit solid angle
Luminance	L_{v}	candela per square metre	cd/m^{2} (= lm/(sr⋅m^{2}))	L^{−2}⋅J	Luminous flux per unit solid angle per unit projected source area. The candela per square metre is sometimes called the nit.
Illuminance	E_{v}	lux (= lumen per square metre)	lx (= lm/m^{2})	L^{−2}⋅J	Luminous flux incident on a surface
Luminous exitance, luminous emittance	M_{v}	lumen per square metre	lm/m^{2}	L^{−2}⋅J	Luminous flux emitted from a surface
Luminous exposure	H_{v}	lux second	lx⋅s	L^{−2}⋅T⋅J	Time-integrated illuminance
Luminous energy density	ω_{v}	lumen second per cubic metre	lm⋅s/m^{3}	L^{−3}⋅T⋅J	
Luminous efficacy (of radiation)	K	lumen per watt	lm/W	M^{−1}⋅L^{−2}⋅T^{3}⋅J	Ratio of luminous flux to radiant flux
Luminous efficacy (of a source)	η	lumen per watt	lm/W	M^{−1}⋅L^{−2}⋅T^{3}⋅J	Ratio of luminous flux to power consumption
Luminous efficiency, luminous coefficient	V			1	Luminous efficacy normalized by the maximum possible efficacy
See also: SI; Photometry; Radiometry

== See also ==
- Photometry (optics)
