= Friedrich von Hefner-Alteneck =

German electrical engineer (1845–1904)

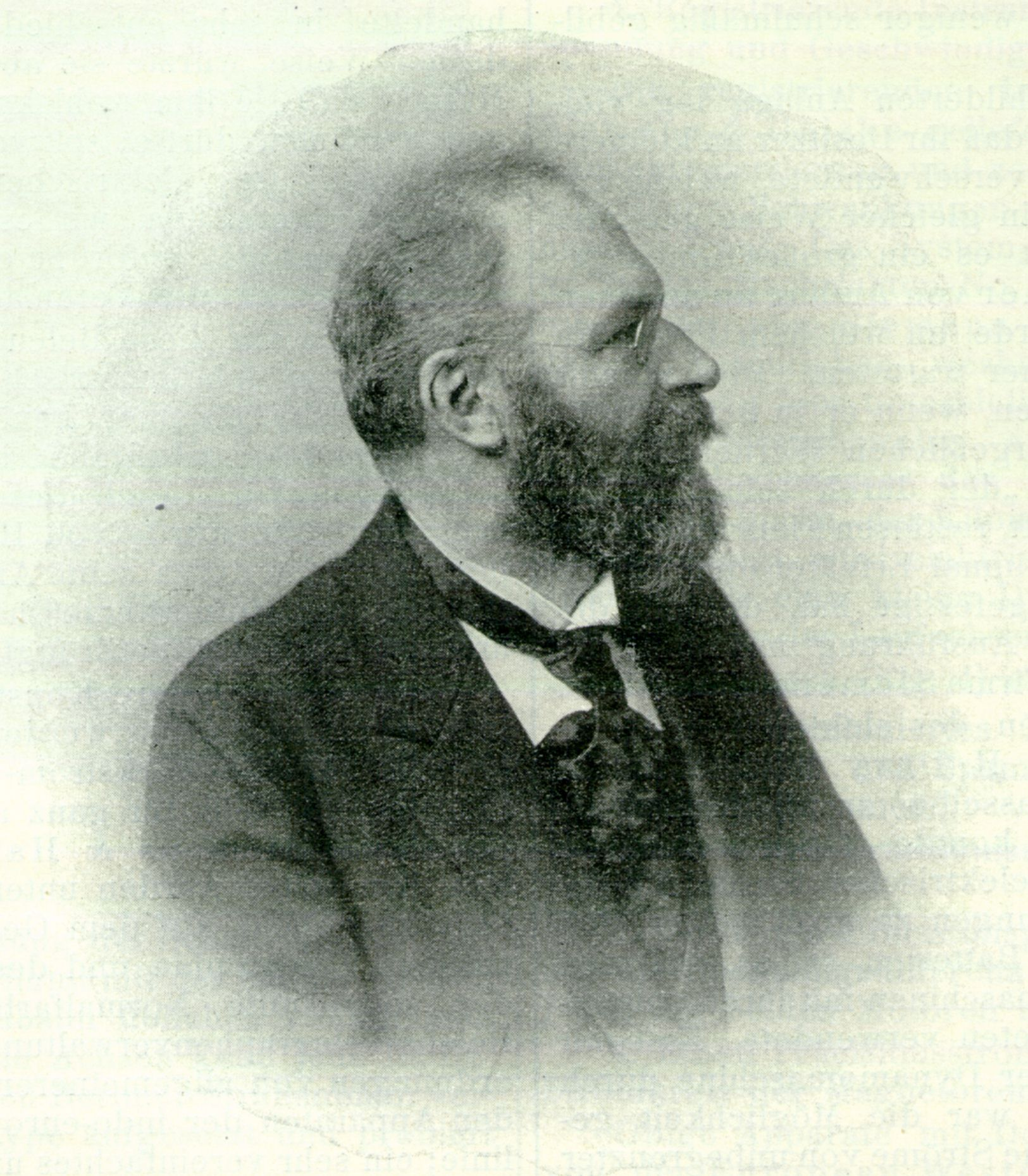
- Born: April 27, 1845; Aschaffenburg, Bavaria
- Died: January 6, 1904 (aged 58); Biesdorf, Bitburg-Prüm, Rhineland-Palatinate

Friedrich Heinrich Philipp Franz von Hefner-Alteneck (April 27, 1845 in Aschaffenburg – January 6, 1904 in Biesdorf near Berlin) was a German electrical engineer and one of the closest aides of Werner von Siemens. He is largely remembered for the invention of the Hefner lamp, which provided the measure of luminous intensity used in Germany, Austria and Scandinavia from 1890 to 1942. The measure was called the Hefnerkerze (HK). The Hefnerkerze was superseded in the 1940s by the modern SI unit, the candela.

He was elected a member of the Royal Swedish Academy of Sciences in 1896.

== Notable Inventions ==
von Hefner-Alteneck's most notable inventions were all conceptualized during his time at Siemens.

- Differential arc lamp - A type of automatic-feed carbon arc lamp
- Drum armature - An efficient form of winding motor rotor coils
- A telegraph keyboard
- The Hefner lamp

== Gallery ==
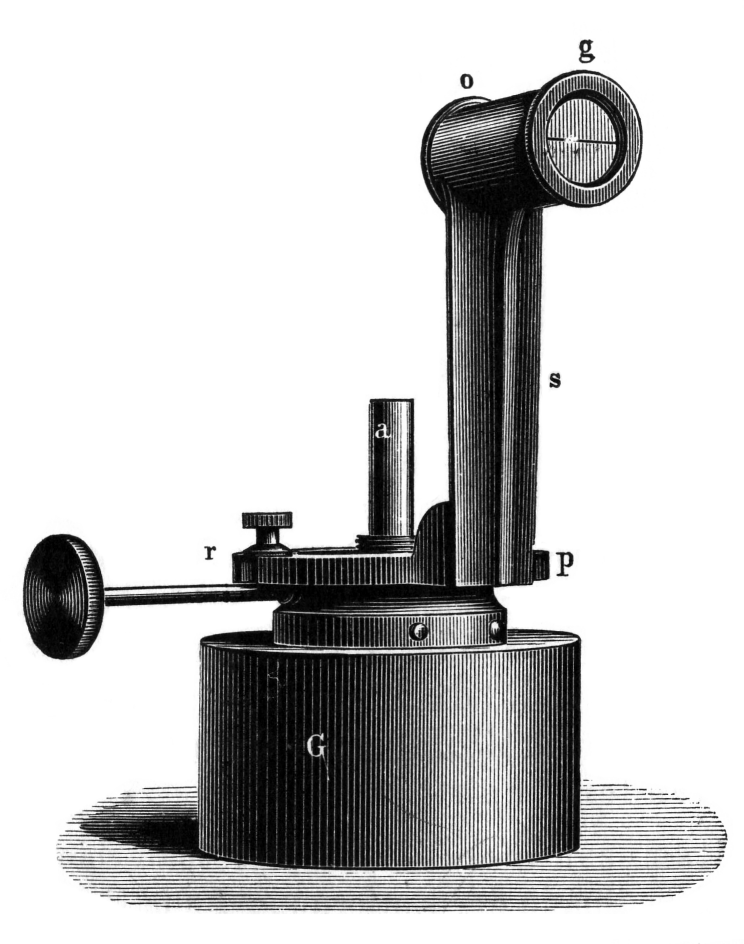
Hefner lamp invented by Hefner-Alteneck
