= Candela per square metre =

SI derived unit of luminance

candela per square metre
- Unit system: SI
- Unit of: luminance
- Symbol: cd/m^{2}
- In SI base units: cd·m^{−2}

The candela per square metre (symbol: cd/m^{2}; alternatively titled candela per square meter) is the unit of luminance in the International System of Units (SI). The unit is based on the candela, the SI unit of luminous intensity, and the square metre, the SI unit of area.

The nit (symbol: nt) is a non-SI name also used for this unit (1 nt = 1 cd/m^{2}). The term nit is believed to come from the Latin word nitēre, "to shine".

As a measure of light emitted per unit area, this unit is frequently used to specify the brightness of a display device. The sRGB spec for monitors targets 80 cd/m^{2}. Typically, monitors calibrated for SDR broadcast or studio color grading should have a brightness of 100 cd/m^{2}. Most consumer desktop liquid crystal displays have luminances of 200 to 300 cd/m^{2}. HDR displays range from around 400 to 2500 cd/m^{2}.

== Comparison with other units of luminance ==
One candela per square metre is equal to:

- 10^{−4} stilbs (the CGS unit of luminance)
- π × 10^{−4} lamberts
- π apostilbs
- 0.292 foot-lamberts
- π × 10^{3} skots
- π × 10^{7} brils
- 1 nit

Units of luminance
		cd/m^{2} (SI unit) ≡ nit ≡ lm/m^{2}/sr	stilb (sb) (CGS unit) ≡ cd/cm^{2}	apostilb (asb) ≡ blondel	bril	skot (sk)	lambert (L)	foot-lambert (fL) = 1 / π cd/ft^{2}
1 cd/m^{2}	=	1	10^{−4}	π ≈ 3.142	10^{7} π ≈ 3.142×10^{7}	10^{3} π ≈ 3.142×10^{3}	10^{−4} π ≈ 3.142×10^{−4}	0.3048^{2} π ≈ 0.2919
1 sb	=	10^{4}	1	10^{4} π ≈ 3.142×10^{4}	10^{11} π ≈ 3.142×10^{11}	10^{7} π ≈ 3.142×10^{7}	π ≈ 3.142	30.48^{2} π ≈ 2,919
1 asb	=	1 / π ≈ 0.3183	10^{−4} / π ≈ 3.183×10^{−5}	1	10^{7}	10^{3}	10^{−4}	0.3048^{2} ≈ 0.0929
1 bril	=	10^{−7} / π ≈ 3.183×10^{−8}	10^{−11} / π ≈ 3.183×10^{−12}	10^{−7}	1	10^{−4}	10^{−11}	0.3048^{2}×10^{−7} ≈ 9.29×10^{−9}
1 sk	=	10^{−3} / π ≈ 3.183×10^{−4}	10^{−7} / π ≈ 3.183×10^{−8}	10^{−3}	10^{4}	1	10^{−7}	0.3048^{2}×10^{−3} ≈ 9.29×10^{−5}
1 L	=	10^{4} / π ≈ 3,183	1 / π ≈ 0.3183	10^{4}	10^{11}	10^{7}	1	0.3048^{2}×10^{4} ≈ 929
1 fL	=	1 / 0.3048^{2} / π ≈ 3.426	1 / 30.48^{2} / π ≈ 3.426×10^{−4}	1 / 0.3048^{2} ≈ 10.76	10^{7} / 0.3048^{2} ≈ 1.076×10^{8}	10^{3} / 0.3048^{2} ≈ 1.076×10^{4}	10^{−4} / 0.3048^{2} ≈ 1.076×10^{−3}	1

== See also ==
- Orders of magnitude (luminance)
- Photometry (optics)

SI photometry quantities
Quantity		Unit		Dimension (Note: The symbols in this column denote dimensions; "L", "T" and "J" are for length, time, and luminous intensity respectively, not the symbols for the units litre, tesla, and joule.)	Notes
Name	Symbol (Note: Standards organizations recommend that photometric quantities be denoted with a subscript "v" (for "visual") to avoid confusion with radiometric or photon quantities. For example: USA Standard Letter Symbols for Illuminating Engineering USAS Z7.1-1967, Y10.18-1967)	Name	Symbol	Dimension	Notes
Luminous energy	Q_{v} (Note: Alternative symbols sometimes seen: W for luminous energy, P or F for luminous flux, and ρ for luminous efficacy of a source.)	lumen second	lm⋅s	T⋅J	The lumen second is sometimes called the talbot.
Luminous flux, luminous power	Φ_{v}	lumen (= candela steradian)	lm (= cd⋅sr)	J	Luminous energy per unit time
Luminous intensity	I_{v}	candela (= lumen per steradian)	cd (= lm/sr)	J	Luminous flux per unit solid angle
Luminance	L_{v}	candela per square metre	cd/m^{2} (= lm/(sr⋅m^{2}))	L^{−2}⋅J	Luminous flux per unit solid angle per unit projected source area. The candela per square metre is sometimes called the nit.
Illuminance	E_{v}	lux (= lumen per square metre)	lx (= lm/m^{2})	L^{−2}⋅J	Luminous flux incident on a surface
Luminous exitance, luminous emittance	M_{v}	lumen per square metre	lm/m^{2}	L^{−2}⋅J	Luminous flux emitted from a surface
Luminous exposure	H_{v}	lux second	lx⋅s	L^{−2}⋅T⋅J	Time-integrated illuminance
Luminous energy density	ω_{v}	lumen second per cubic metre	lm⋅s/m^{3}	L^{−3}⋅T⋅J	
Luminous efficacy (of radiation)	K	lumen per watt	lm/W	M^{−1}⋅L^{−2}⋅T^{3}⋅J	Ratio of luminous flux to radiant flux
Luminous efficacy (of a source)	η	lumen per watt	lm/W	M^{−1}⋅L^{−2}⋅T^{3}⋅J	Ratio of luminous flux to power consumption
Luminous efficiency, luminous coefficient	V			1	Luminous efficacy normalized by the maximum possible efficacy
See also: SI; Photometry; Radiometry
