= Luminance =

Photometric measure

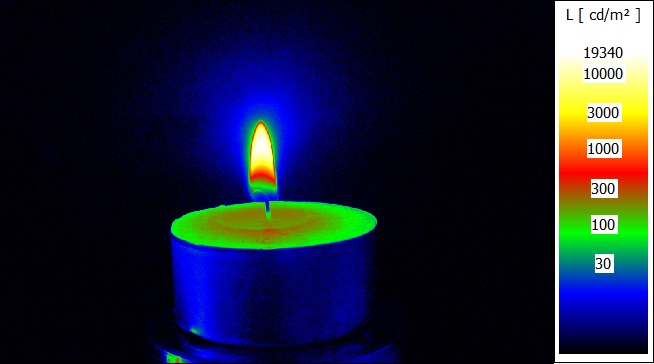
A tea light-type candle, imaged with a luminance camera; false colors indicate luminance levels per the bar on the right (cd/m^{2})

Luminance is a photometric measure of the luminous intensity per unit area of light travelling in a given direction. It describes the amount of light that passes through, is emitted from, or is reflected from a particular area, and falls within a given solid angle.

The procedure for conversion from spectral radiance to luminance is standardized by the CIE and ISO.

Brightness is the term for the subjective impression of the objective luminance measurement standard (see Objectivity (science) § Objectivity in measurement for the importance of this contrast).

The SI unit for luminance is candela per square metre (cd/m^{2}). A non-SI term for the same unit is the nit. The unit in the Centimetre–gram–second system of units (CGS) (which predated the SI system) is the stilb, which is equal to one candela per square centimetre or 10 kcd/m^{2}.

== Description ==
Luminance is often used to characterize emission or reflection from flat, diffuse surfaces. Luminance levels indicate how much luminous power could be detected by the human eye looking at a particular surface from a particular angle of view. Luminance is thus an indicator of how bright the surface will appear. In this case, the solid angle of interest is the solid angle subtended by the eye's pupil.

Luminance is used in the video industry to characterize the brightness of displays. A typical computer display emits between 50 and 300 cd/m^{2}. The sun has a luminance of about 1.6×10^{9} cd/m^{2} at noon.

Luminance is invariant in geometric optics. This means that for an ideal optical system, the luminance at the output is the same as the input luminance.

For real, passive optical systems, the output luminance is at most equal to the input. As an example, if one uses a lens to form an image that is smaller than the source object, the luminous power is concentrated into a smaller area, meaning that the illuminance is higher at the image. The light at the image plane, however, fills a larger solid angle so the luminance comes out to be the same assuming there is no loss at the lens. The image can never be "brighter" than the source.

== Health effects ==
Retinal damage can occur when the eye is exposed to high luminance. Damage can occur because of local heating of the retina. Photochemical effects can also cause damage, especially at short wavelengths.

The IEC 60825 series gives guidance on safety relating to exposure of the eye to lasers, which are high luminance sources. The IEC 62471 series gives guidance for evaluating the photobiological safety of lamps and lamp systems including luminaires. Specifically it specifies the exposure limits, reference measurement technique and classification scheme for the evaluation and control of photobiological hazards from all electrically powered incoherent broadband sources of optical radiation, including LEDs but excluding lasers, in the wavelength range from 200 nm through 3000 nm. This standard was prepared as Standard CIE S 009:2002 by the International Commission on Illumination.

== Luminance meter ==
A luminance meter is a device used in photometry that can measure the luminance in a particular direction and with a particular solid angle. The simplest devices measure the luminance in a single direction while imaging luminance meters measure luminance in a way similar to the way a digital camera records color images.

== Formulation ==
Parameters for defining the luminance

The luminance of a specified point of a light source, in a specified direction, is defined by the mixed partial derivative
$$L_\mathrm{v} = \frac{\mathrm{d}^2\Phi_\mathrm{v}}{\mathrm{d}\Sigma\,\mathrm{d}\Omega_\Sigma \cos \theta_\Sigma}$$
where

- L_{v} is the luminance (cd/m^{2});
- d^{2}Φ_{v} is the luminous flux (lm) leaving the area dΣ in any direction contained inside the solid angle dΩ_{Σ};
- dΣ is an infinitesimal area (m^{2}) of the source containing the specified point;
- dΩ_{Σ} is an infinitesimal solid angle (sr) containing the specified direction; and
- θ_{Σ} is the angle between the normal n_{Σ} to the surface dΣ and the specified direction.

If light travels through a lossless medium, the luminance does not change along a given light ray. As the ray crosses an arbitrary surface S, the luminance is given by
$$L_\mathrm{v} = \frac{\mathrm{d}^2\Phi_\mathrm{v}}{\mathrm{d}S\,\mathrm{d}\Omega_S \cos \theta_S}$$
where

- dS is the infinitesimal area of S seen from the source inside the solid angle dΩ_{Σ};
- dΩ_{S} is the infinitesimal solid angle subtended by dΣ as seen from dS; and
- θ_{S} is the angle between the normal n_{S} to dS and the direction of the light.

More generally, the luminance along a light ray can be defined as
$$L_\mathrm{v} = n^2\frac{\mathrm{d}\Phi_\mathrm{v}}{\mathrm{d}G}$$
where

- dG is the etendue of an infinitesimally narrow beam containing the specified ray;
- dΦ_{v} is the luminous flux carried by this beam; and
- n is the index of refraction of the medium.

== Relation to illuminance ==
Comparison of photometric and radiometric quantities

The luminance of a reflecting surface is related to the illuminance it receives:
$$\int_{\Omega_\Sigma} L_\text{v} \mathrm{d}\Omega_\Sigma \cos \theta_\Sigma = M_\text{v} = E_\text{v} R,$$
where the integral covers all the directions of emission Ω_{Σ},

- M_{v} is the surface's luminous exitance;
- E_{v} is the received illuminance; and
- R is the reflectance.

In the case of a perfectly diffuse reflector (also called a Lambertian reflector), the luminance is isotropic, per Lambert's cosine law. Then the relationship is simply
$$L_\text{v} = \frac{E_\text{v} R}{\pi}.$$

== Units ==
A variety of units have been used for luminance, besides the candela per square metre. Luminance is essentially the same as surface brightness, the term used in astronomy. This is measured with a logarithmic scale, magnitudes per square arcsecond (MPSAS).

Units of luminance
		cd/m^{2} (SI unit) ≡ nit ≡ lm/m^{2}/sr	stilb (sb) (CGS unit) ≡ cd/cm^{2}	apostilb (asb) ≡ blondel	bril	skot (sk)	lambert (L)	foot-lambert (fL) = 1 / π cd/ft^{2}
1 cd/m^{2}	=	1	10^{−4}	π ≈ 3.142	10^{7} π ≈ 3.142×10^{7}	10^{3} π ≈ 3.142×10^{3}	10^{−4} π ≈ 3.142×10^{−4}	0.3048^{2} π ≈ 0.2919
1 sb	=	10^{4}	1	10^{4} π ≈ 3.142×10^{4}	10^{11} π ≈ 3.142×10^{11}	10^{7} π ≈ 3.142×10^{7}	π ≈ 3.142	30.48^{2} π ≈ 2,919
1 asb	=	1 / π ≈ 0.3183	10^{−4} / π ≈ 3.183×10^{−5}	1	10^{7}	10^{3}	10^{−4}	0.3048^{2} ≈ 0.0929
1 bril	=	10^{−7} / π ≈ 3.183×10^{−8}	10^{−11} / π ≈ 3.183×10^{−12}	10^{−7}	1	10^{−4}	10^{−11}	0.3048^{2}×10^{−7} ≈ 9.29×10^{−9}
1 sk	=	10^{−3} / π ≈ 3.183×10^{−4}	10^{−7} / π ≈ 3.183×10^{−8}	10^{−3}	10^{4}	1	10^{−7}	0.3048^{2}×10^{−3} ≈ 9.29×10^{−5}
1 L	=	10^{4} / π ≈ 3,183	1 / π ≈ 0.3183	10^{4}	10^{11}	10^{7}	1	0.3048^{2}×10^{4} ≈ 929
1 fL	=	1 / 0.3048^{2} / π ≈ 3.426	1 / 30.48^{2} / π ≈ 3.426×10^{−4}	1 / 0.3048^{2} ≈ 10.76	10^{7} / 0.3048^{2} ≈ 1.076×10^{8}	10^{3} / 0.3048^{2} ≈ 1.076×10^{4}	10^{−4} / 0.3048^{2} ≈ 1.076×10^{−3}	1

== See also ==
- Relative luminance
- Orders of magnitude (luminance)
- Diffuse reflection
- Etendue
- Exposure value § EV as a measure of luminance and illuminance
- Lambertian reflectance
- Lightness (color)
- Luma, the representation of luminance in a video monitor
- Lumen (unit)
- Radiance, radiometric quantity analogous to luminance
- Brightness, the subjective impression of luminance
- Glare (vision)

=== Table of SI light-related units ===
SI photometry quantities
Quantity		Unit		Dimension (Note: The symbols in this column denote dimensions; "L", "T" and "J" are for length, time, and luminous intensity respectively, not the symbols for the units litre, tesla, and joule.)	Notes
Name	Symbol (Note: Standards organizations recommend that photometric quantities be denoted with a subscript "v" (for "visual") to avoid confusion with radiometric or photon quantities. For example: USA Standard Letter Symbols for Illuminating Engineering USAS Z7.1-1967, Y10.18-1967)	Name	Symbol	Dimension	Notes
Luminous energy	Q_{v} (Note: Alternative symbols sometimes seen: W for luminous energy, P or F for luminous flux, and ρ for luminous efficacy of a source.)	lumen second	lm⋅s	T⋅J	The lumen second is sometimes called the talbot.
Luminous flux, luminous power	Φ_{v}	lumen (= candela steradian)	lm (= cd⋅sr)	J	Luminous energy per unit time
Luminous intensity	I_{v}	candela (= lumen per steradian)	cd (= lm/sr)	J	Luminous flux per unit solid angle
Luminance	L_{v}	candela per square metre	cd/m^{2} (= lm/(sr⋅m^{2}))	L^{−2}⋅J	Luminous flux per unit solid angle per unit projected source area. The candela per square metre is sometimes called the nit.
Illuminance	E_{v}	lux (= lumen per square metre)	lx (= lm/m^{2})	L^{−2}⋅J	Luminous flux incident on a surface
Luminous exitance, luminous emittance	M_{v}	lumen per square metre	lm/m^{2}	L^{−2}⋅J	Luminous flux emitted from a surface
Luminous exposure	H_{v}	lux second	lx⋅s	L^{−2}⋅T⋅J	Time-integrated illuminance
Luminous energy density	ω_{v}	lumen second per cubic metre	lm⋅s/m^{3}	L^{−3}⋅T⋅J	
Luminous efficacy (of radiation)	K	lumen per watt	lm/W	M^{−1}⋅L^{−2}⋅T^{3}⋅J	Ratio of luminous flux to radiant flux
Luminous efficacy (of a source)	η	lumen per watt	lm/W	M^{−1}⋅L^{−2}⋅T^{3}⋅J	Ratio of luminous flux to power consumption
Luminous efficiency, luminous coefficient	V			1	Luminous efficacy normalized by the maximum possible efficacy
See also: SI; Photometry; Radiometry
