= Stilb =

Stilb can refer to:

- Mullet (haircut)
- Stilb (unit), a CGS unit of luminance
