= Square second =

Square second may mean:

- square second of arc, a unit of solid angle
- square seconds, a unit of square duration
