= Square degree =

Unit of solid angle

square degree
- Unit of: solid angle
- Symbol: deg^{2}

Conversions
1 deg^{2} in ...	... is equal to ...
- SI units: ≈ 3.04617×10^{−4} sr
- arcsec^{2}: 12960000 arcsec^{2}

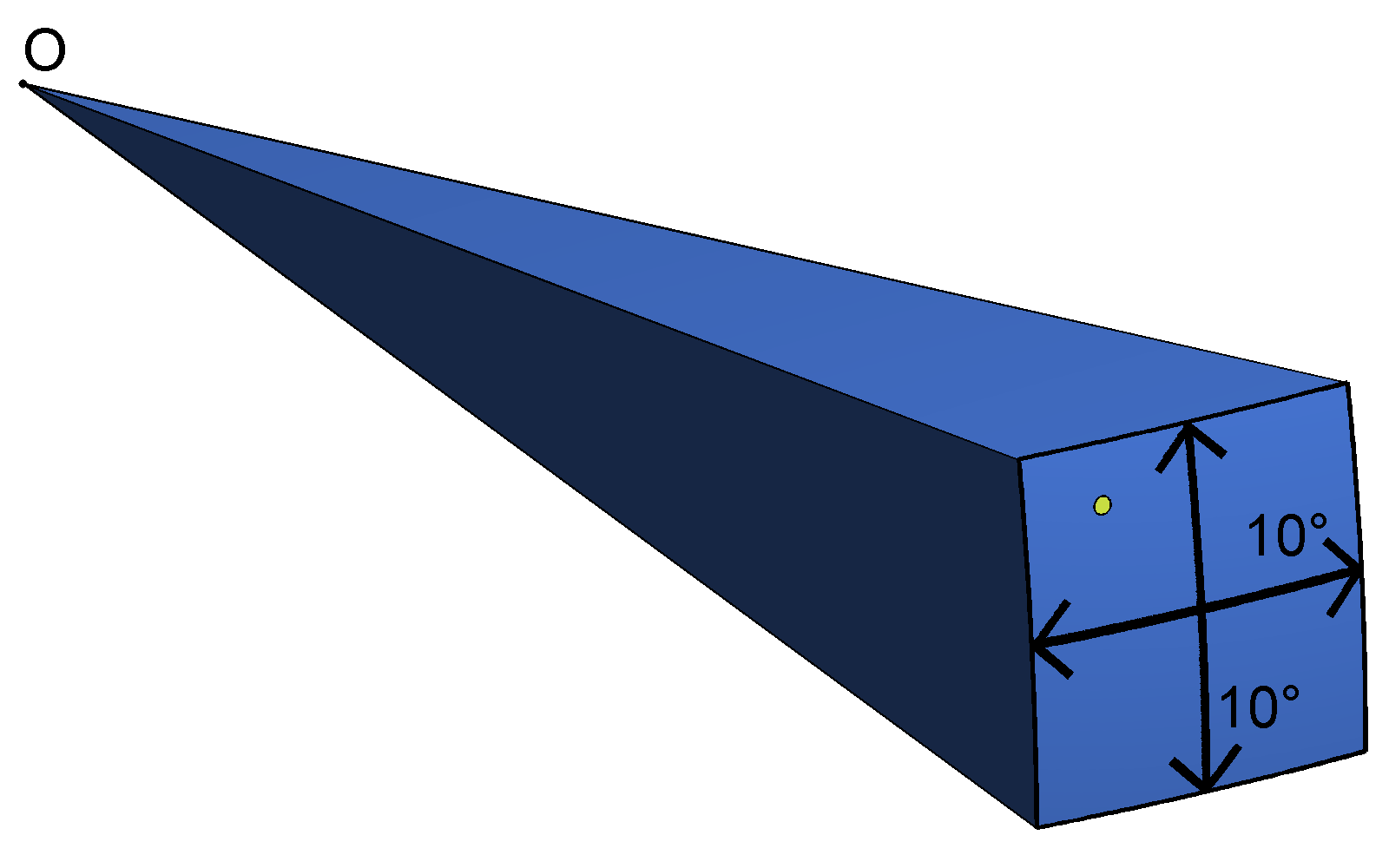
An illustration of a solid angle formed by a rectangular pyramid, whose apex angles are both 10 degrees. The resulting solid angle is about 99.747369 square degrees. The size of Moon, as seen from Earth, is shown in yellow for comparison.

A square degree (deg^{2}) is a non-SI unit measure of solid angle. Other denotations include sq. deg. and (°)^{2}. Just as degrees are used to measure parts of a circle, square degrees are used to measure parts of a sphere.

Analogous to one degree being equal to π/180 radians, a square degree is equal to (π/180)^{2} steradians (sr), or about 1/3283 sr or about 0.3046 msr (millisteradian). The whole sphere has a solid angle of 4π sr, which is approximately 41253 deg^{2}:

$$4 \pi \left(\frac{180}{\pi}\right)^2 \, {\deg}^2 = \frac{360^2}{\pi} ~ {\deg}^2 = \frac{129\,600}{\pi} ~ {\deg}^2 \approx 41\,252.96 ~ {\deg}^2.$$

== Subdivisions ==
Each square degree is equal to 3600 square arcminutes, and each square arcminute is equal to 3600 square arcseconds. So, each square degree is equal to 12960000 square arcseconds. The whole sphere contains about 148.51 million square arcminutes and about 534.64 billion square arcseconds.

== Examples ==
- The full moon covers only about 0.2 deg^{2} of the sky when viewed from the surface of the Earth. The Moon is only a half degree across (i.e. a angular diameter of roughly 0.5°), so the moon's disk covers a solid angle of π(0.5°/2)^{2}, or 0.2 deg^{2}. The moon's solid angle varies from 0.188 to 0.244 deg^{2} as its distance from the Earth varies due to its orbit.
- Viewed from Earth, the Sun is roughly half a degree across (the same as the full moon) and covers only 0.2 deg^{2} as well.
- It would take 210100 times the full moon (or the Sun) to cover the entire celestial sphere.
- Conversely, an average full moon (or the Sun) covers the fraction 2 / 210100, or less than 1/1000 of a percent (0.00000952381) of the celestial hemisphere, or above-the-horizon sky.
- Assuming the Earth to be a sphere with a surface area of 510 million square kilometres, the area of Northern Ireland (14130 km^{2}) represents a solid angle of 1.14 deg^{2}, Connecticut (14357 km^{2}) represents a solid angle of 1.16 deg^{2}, and Equatorial Guinea (28050 km^{2}) represents a solid angle of 2 deg^{2}.
- The largest constellation, Hydra, covers a solid angle of 1303 deg^{2}, whereas the smallest, Crux, covers only 68 deg^{2}.

== See also ==
- Steradian
- Spat (angular unit)
- Minute and second of arc
- List of constellations by area
