= Orders of magnitude (illuminance) =

Comparison of a wide range of brightnesses

As visual perception varies logarithmically, it is helpful to have an appreciation of both illuminance and luminance by orders of magnitude.

== Illuminance ==
To help compare different orders of magnitude, the following list describes various source in lux, which is a lumen per square metre.

Factor (lux)	Multiple	Value	Item
0	0 lux	0 lux	Absolute darkness
10^{−4}	100 microlux	100 microlux	Starlight overcast moonless night sky
10^{−4}	100 microlux	140 microlux	Venus at brightest
10^{−4}	100 microlux	200 microlux	Starlight clear moonless night sky excluding airglow
10^{−3}	1 millilux	2 millilux	Starlight clear moonless night sky including airglow
10^{−2}	1 centilux	1 centilux	Quarter Moon
10^{−1}	1 decilux	2.5 decilux	Full Moon on a clear night
10^{0}	1 lux	< 1 lux	Extreme of darkest storm clouds, sunset or sunrise
10^{1}	1 decalux	40 lux	Fully overcast, sunset or sunrise
10^{2}	1 hectolux	< 200 lux	Extreme of darkest storm clouds, midday
10^{2}	1 hectolux	400 lux	Sunrise or sunset on a clear day (ambient illumination)
10^{4}	10 kilolux	10–25 kilolux	Typical overcast day, midday
10^{4}	10 kilolux	20 kilolux	Shade illuminated by entire clear blue sky, midday
10^{5}	100 kilolux	110 kilolux	Bright sunlight
10^{5}	100 kilolux	120 kilolux	Brightest sunlight

== Luminance ==
This section lists examples of luminances, measured in candelas per square metre and grouped by order of magnitude.

Factor (cd/m^{2})	Multiple	Value	Item
10^{−6}	μcd/m^{2}	1 μcd/m^{2}	Absolute threshold of vision
10^{−5}			
10^{−4}			
10^{−3}	mcd/m^{2}	100 μcd/m^{2}	Cloudy night sky without moon
10^{−3}	mcd/m^{2}	400 μcd/m^{2}	"Darkest sky"
10^{−3}	mcd/m^{2}	1 mcd/m^{2}	Night sky
10^{−3}	mcd/m^{2}	1.4 mcd/m^{2}	Typical photographic scene lit by full moon
10^{−2}		5 mcd/m^{2}	Approximate scotopic/mesopic threshold
10^{−1}			
10^{0}	cd/m^{2}	2 cd/m^{2}	Floodlit buildings, monuments, and fountains
10^{1}		5 cd/m^{2}	Approximate mesopic/photopic threshold
10^{1}		25 cd/m^{2}	Typical photographic scene at sunrise or sunset
10^{1}		30 cd/m^{2}	Green electroluminescent source
10^{2}		55 cd/m^{2}	Standard SMPTE cinema screen luminance
10^{2}		80 cd/m^{2}	Monitor white in the sRGB reference viewing environment
10^{2}		250 cd/m^{2}	Peak luminance of a typical LCD monitor
10^{2}		700 cd/m^{2}	Typical photographic scene on overcast day
10^{3}	kcd/m^{2}	1 kcd/m^{2}	Cloudy sky at noon
10^{3}	kcd/m^{2}	2 kcd/m^{2}	Average cloudy sky
10^{3}	kcd/m^{2}	2.5 kcd/m^{2}	Moon surface
10^{3}	kcd/m^{2}	3–5 kcd/m^{2}	Clear sky
10^{4}		5 kcd/m^{2}	Typical photographic scene in full sunlight
10^{4}		8 kcd/m^{2}	Average clear sky
10^{4}		10 kcd/m^{2}	Clear sky at noon
10^{4}		10 kcd/m^{2}	White illuminated cloud
10^{4}		12 kcd/m^{2}	Fluorescent lamp
10^{5}		75 kcd/m^{2}	Low pressure sodium-vapor lamp
10^{5}		130 kcd/m^{2}	Frosted incandescent light bulb
10^{6}	Mcd/m^{2}	600 kcd/m^{2}	Solar disk at horizon
10^{7}		7 Mcd/m^{2}	Filament of a clear incandescent lamp
10^{8}		100 Mcd/m^{2}	Possible retinal damage
10^{9}	Gcd/m^{2}	1.6 Gcd/m^{2}	Solar disk at noon

== See also ==
- Photometry (optics)
- Extraterrestrial sky
