= Spat (angular unit) =

Unit of angle in solid geometry

The spat (symbol sp), from the Latin spatium ("space"), is a unit of solid angle. One spat is equal to 4π steradians or approximately 41253 square degrees of solid angle (sequence A125560 in the OEIS). Thus 1 sp is the solid angle subtended by a complete sphere at its center.

== See also ==
- Turn (angle) — the plane angle counterpart of the spat, equivalent to 2π radians
