= Amyl acetate =

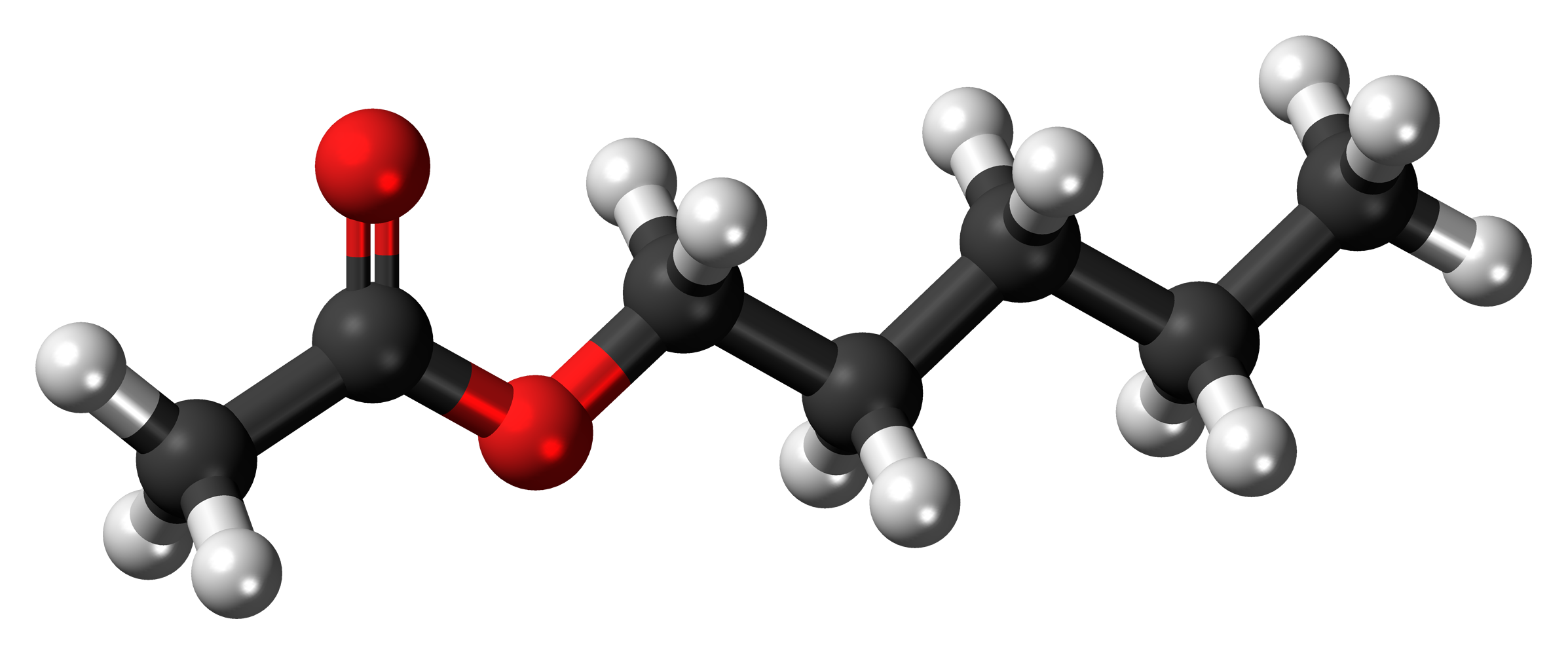

Names
- Preferred IUPAC name Pentyl acetate
- Other names: Acetic acid n-amyl ester; Acetic acid pentyl ester; n-Amyl acetate; Amyl ethanoate; Pear oil; Pentyl ethanoate; Amyl acetic ester; Amyl acetic ether; 1-Pentanol acetate

Identifiers
CAS Number	628-63-7
3D model (JSmol)	Interactive image; Interactive image
Beilstein Reference	1744753
ChEBI	CHEBI:167899
ChEMBL	ChEMBL47769
ChemSpider	11843
ECHA InfoCard	100.010.044
EC Number	211-047-3
MeSH	Amyl+acetate
PubChem CID	12348
RTECS number	AJ1925000
UNII	92Q24NH7AS
UN number	UN 1104
CompTox Dashboard (EPA)	DTXSID1027263
- InChI: InChI=1S/C7H14O2/c1-3-4-5-6-9-7(2)8/h3-6H2,1-2H3 Key: PGMYKACGEOXYJE-UHFFFAOYSA-N; InChI=1/C7H14O2/c1-3-4-5-6-9-7(2)8/h3-6H2,1-2H3 Key: PGMYKACGEOXYJE-UHFFFAOYAQ
- SMILES: CCCCCOC(C)=O; O=C(OCCCCC)C

Properties
Chemical formula	C_{7}H_{14}O_{2}
Molar mass	130.19 g/mol
Appearance	Colorless liquid
Odor	Banana-like
Density	0.876 g/cm^{3}
Melting point	−71 °C (−96 °F; 202 K)
Boiling point	149 °C (300 °F; 422 K)
Solubility in other solvents	Water: 1.73 mg/ml (25 °C)
Vapor pressure	4 mmHg
Magnetic susceptibility (χ)	−89.06·10^{−6} cm^{3}/mol

Hazards
- Occupational safety and health (OHS/OSH)
Main hazards	Flammable
NFPA 704 (fire diamond)	1 3 0
Flash point	23 °C (73 °F; 296 K)
Explosive limits	1.1–7.5%
- Lethal dose or concentration (LD, LC)
LD_{50} (median dose)	7400 mg/kg, oral (rabbit); 6500 mg/kg, oral (rat)
LC_{Lo} (lowest published)	5200 ppm (rat)
- NIOSH (US health exposure limits)
PEL (Permissible)	100 ppm, 8 hr TWA (525 mg/m^{3})
REL (Recommended)	TWA 100 ppm (525 mg/m^{3})
IDLH (Immediate danger)	1000 ppm
Safety data sheet (SDS)	External MSDS
- Except where otherwise noted, data are given for materials in their standard state (at 25 °C [77 °F], 100 kPa). verify (what is ?) Infobox references

Amyl acetate (pentyl acetate) is an organic compound and an ester with the chemical formula CH_{3}COO[CH_{2}]_{4}CH_{3} and the molecular weight 130.19 g/mol. It is colorless and has a scent similar to bananas and apples. More broadly, its aroma is described as ethereal, fruity, banana, pear, apple. The compound is the condensation product of acetic acid and 1-pentanol. However, esters formed from other pentanol isomers (amyl alcohols), or mixtures of pentanols, are often referred to as amyl acetate. The symptoms of exposure to amyl acetate in humans are dermatitis, central nervous system depression, narcosis and irritation to the eyes and nose.

== Uses ==
Amyl acetate is a solvent for paints, lacquers, and liquid bandages; and a flavorant. It also fuels the Hefner lamp and fermentative productions of penicillin.

== See also ==
- Isoamyl acetate, also known as banana oil.
- Esters, organic molecules with the same functional groups
