= Simon Antoine Jean L'Huilier =

Swiss mathematician (1750–1840)

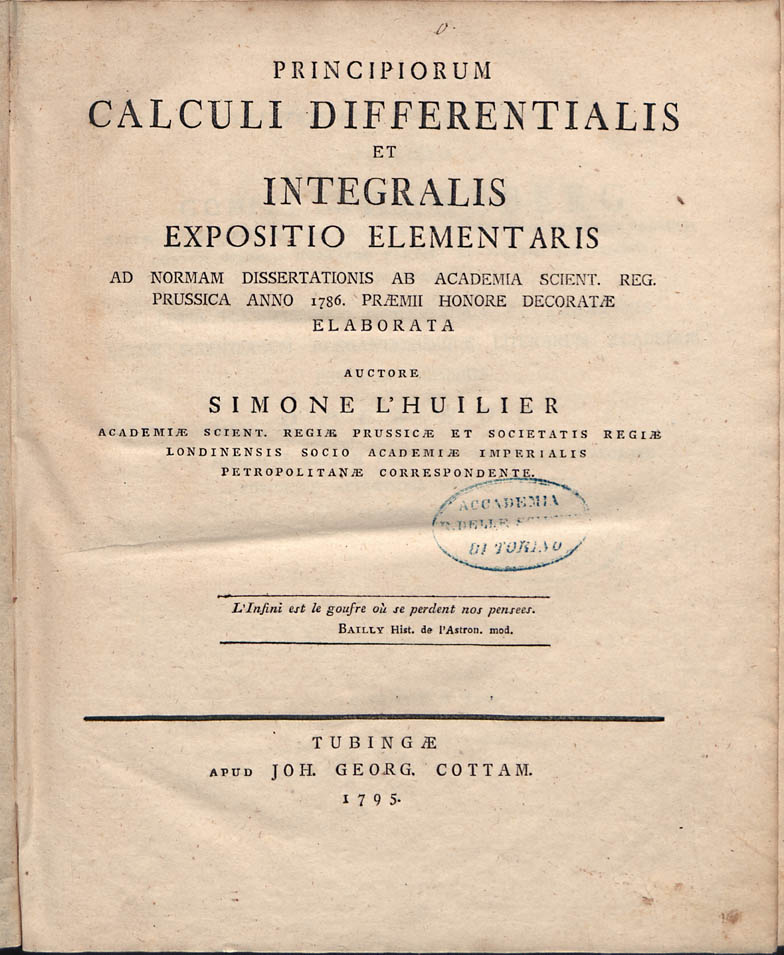
Principiorum calculi differentialis et integralis expositio elementaris, 1795

Simon Antoine Jean L'Huilier (or L'Huillier) (24 April 1750 in Geneva – 28 March 1840 in Geneva) was a Swiss mathematician of French Huguenot descent. He is known for his work in mathematical analysis and topology, and in particular the generalization of Euler's formula for planar graphs.

He won the mathematics section prize of the Berlin Academy of Sciences for 1784 in response to a question on the foundations of the calculus. The work was published in his 1787 book Exposition elementaire des principes des calculs superieurs. (A Latin version was published in 1795.) Although L'Huilier won the prize, Joseph Lagrange, who had suggested the question and was the lead judge of the submissions, was disappointed in the work, considering it "the best of a bad lot." Lagrange would go on to publish his own work on foundations.

== L'Huilier and Cauchy ==
L'Huilier introduced the abbreviation "lim" for limit, using the first three letters of the Latin limite, with a full stop) to denote the limit of a variable expression. This reappeared in 1821 in Cours d'Analyse by Augustin Louis Cauchy, who would later create his approach based on infinitesimals defined in terms of variable quantities. L'Huilier first employed this symbol on page 24 of the essay and explained its convenience for indicating the limiting value of simultaneous changes in variables on page 31. This represents the earliest recorded use of a limit notation in European analysis and laid the groundwork for the modern "lim" symbol.

== Royal Society fellow ==
He was elected in May, 1791 a Fellow of the Royal Society

Note that this surname is sometimes rendered as Lhuilier or Lhuillier.

== See also ==
- L'Huilier's theorem
