= Hefner lamp =

Flame lamp used in photometry

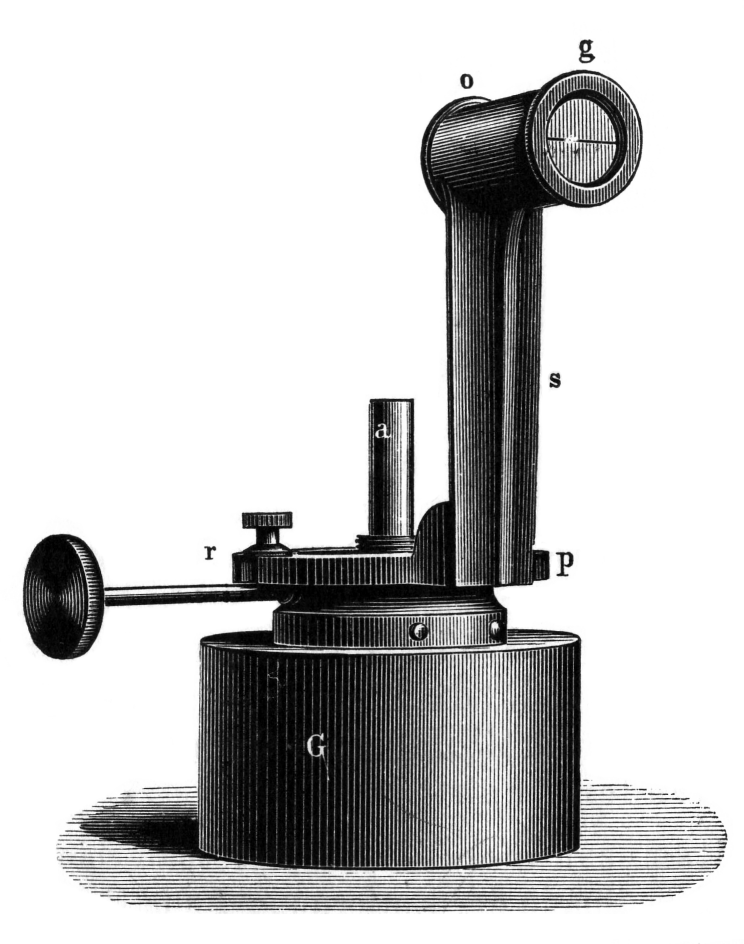
Hefner lamp or in German Hefnerkerze

The Hefner lamp, or in German Hefnerkerze, is a flame lamp used in photometry that burns amyl acetate.

The lamp was invented by Friedrich von Hefner-Alteneck in 1884 and he proposed its use as a standard flame for photometric purposes with a luminous intensity unit of the Hefnerkerze (HK). The lamp was specified as having a 40 mm flame height and an 8 mm diameter wick.

The Hefner lamp provided the German, Austrian, and Scandinavian standard for luminosity during the late nineteenth and early twentieth centuries. The unit of light intensity was defined as that produced by the lamp burning amyl acetate with a 40 mm flame height. The light unit was adopted by the German gas industry in 1890 and known as the Hefnereinheit. In 1897 it was also adopted by the Association of German Electrical Engineers under the name Hefnerkerze (HK).

Germany moved to using the new candle (NC) from 1 July 1942 and the candela (cd) from 1948.

1 Hefnerkerze is about 0.920 candelas.

== See also ==
- Candlepower
- List of obsolete units of measurement
