= Biesdorf =

- Municipality
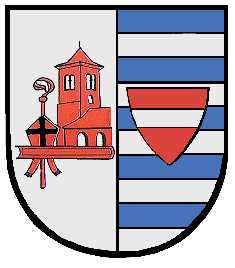
- Coat of arms

- Location of Biesdorf within Eifelkreis Bitburg-Prüm district
- Interactive map of Biesdorf
- Location within Germany Location within Rhineland-Palatinate
- Coordinates: 49°53′15″N 6°18′17″E
- Country: Germany
- State: Rhineland-Palatinate
- District: Eifelkreis Bitburg-Prüm
- Municipal assoc.: Südeifel
- Subdivisions: 2

Government
  - Mayor (2019–24): Alwin Houscht

Area
  - Total: 5.47 km^{2} (2.11 sq mi)
- Elevation: 280–300 m (920–980 ft)

Population (2025-12-31)
  - Total: 239
  - Density: 43.7/km^{2} (113/sq mi)
- Time zone: UTC+01:00 (CET)
  - Summer (DST): UTC+02:00 (CEST)
- Postal codes: 54675
- Dialling codes: 06566
- Vehicle registration: BIT
- Website: Biesdorf at website www.suedeifelinfo.de

Biesdorf (German pronunciation: [ˈbiːsˌdɔʁf]) is a municipality in the district of Bitburg-Prüm, in Rhineland-Palatinate, western Germany.
