= L'Huilier's theorem =

Theorem in geometry

L'Huilier's theorem is a theorem on a triangle in Euclidean geometry proved by the Swiss mathematician Simon Antoine Jean L'Huilier in 1809.

== Theorem ==
L'Huilier's theorem—Let $r$ be the radius of the incircle of a triangle and $r_{\text{A}}, r_{\text{B}}, r_{\text{C}}$ be the radii of the three excircles. Then

$$\frac{1}{r} = \frac{1}{r_{\text{A}}} + \frac{1}{r_{\text{B}}} + \frac{1}{r_{\text{C}}}$$

holds.

== Proof ==
Let $S$ be the area of a triangle and $a, b, c$ be the lengths of the three sides. The reciprocal of the radius of the incircle is

$$\frac{1}{r} = \frac{a+b+c}{2S}$$

and the reciprocal of the radii of the excircles are

$$\begin{align}
\frac{1}{r_\text{A}} &= \frac{-a+b+c}{2S},\\
\frac{1}{r_\text{B}} &= \frac{a-b+c}{2S},\\
\frac{1}{r_\text{C}} &= \frac{a+b-c}{2S}.
\end{align}$$

Therefore, the sum of the reciprocals are

$$\begin{align}
\frac{1}{r_\text{A}} + \frac{1}{r_\text{B}} + \frac{1}{r_\text{C}}
&= \frac{-a+b+c}{2S} + \frac{a-b+c}{2S} + \frac{a+b-c}{2S} \\
&= \frac{a+b+c}{2S} = \frac{1}{r}.
\end{align}$$

== Extension ==
Although L'Huilier's theorem is a result on the Euclidean plane (two dimension), it can be extended to $n$-dimensional Euclidean space.

Let $K$ be an $n$-simplex (triangle in two-dimension and tetrahedron in three-dimension). The inscribed sphere can be defined as the sphere whose center is the point in the interior of $K$ that has equal distance to each face of $K$; let $r_0$ be its radius. Similarly, an escribed sphere can be defined as the sphere whose center is the point in the region to the opposite side of only one of the faces and has equal distance to each face. Because $K$ has $n+1$ faces, let these radii be $r_1, \ldots, r_{n+1}$. Then

$$\frac{1}{r_1} + \frac{1}{r_2} + \cdots + \frac{1}{r_{n+1}} = \frac{n-1}{r_0}$$

holds. The proof uses linear algebra.

== Related items ==
In his book, L'Huilier (1809) also suggested

$$S = \sqrt{r \cdot r_\text{A} \cdot r_\text{B} \cdot r_\text{C} \vphantom{A}}.$$

Since

$$r_\text{A} \, r_\text{B} \, r_\text{C} = \frac{S^2}{r}$$

holds, by multiplying to L'Huilier's theorem

$$\frac{1}{r_\text{A}} + \frac{1}{r_\text{B}} + \frac{1}{r_\text{C}} = \frac{1}{r},$$

we obtain

$$r_\text{B} \, r_\text{C} + r_\text{C} \, r_\text{A} + r_\text{A} \, r_\text{B} = s^2,$$

where $s=(a+b+c)/2$ is half of the circumference of the triangle.
