= Candela =

SI unit of luminous intensity

candela
- Photopic (black) and scotopic (green) luminous efficiency functions. The photopic includes the CIE 1931 standard (solid), the Judd–Vos 1978 modified data (dashed), and the Sharpe, Stockman, Jagla & Jägle 2005 data (dotted). The horizontal axis is wavelength in nm.

General information
- Unit system: SI
- Unit of: luminous intensity
- Symbol: cd

Conversions
| 1 cd in ... | ... is equal to ... |
- international candles: ≈ 1.02 cp
- Hefnerkerze: ≈ 1.11 HK

Candela (symbol: cd) is the SI unit of luminous intensity. It measures the luminous power per unit solid angle emitted in a particular direction. A common wax candle has a luminous intensity of roughly 1 cd.

The word candela is Latin for candle. The old name "candle" is still sometimes used, as in foot-candle and the modern definition of candlepower.

== Definition ==
The 26th General Conference on Weights and Measures (CGPM) redefined the candela in 2018. The new definition, which took effect on 20 May 2019, is:

The candela [...] is defined by taking the fixed numerical value of the luminous efficacy of monochromatic radiation of frequency 540×10^{12} Hz, (Note: This frequency corresponds to a wavelength of 555 nm in air, which is yellowish-green light approximately at the peak of human visual response. The colour can be approximated on an sRGB display with CSS colour value rgb(120,255,0) or hex #78ff00 .) K_{cd}, to be 683 when expressed in the unit lm W^{−1}, which is equal to cd sr W^{−1}, or cd sr kg^{−1} m^{−2} s^{3}, where the kilogram, metre and second are defined in terms of h, c and Δν_{Cs}.

=== Explanation ===

The frequency chosen is in the visible spectrum near green, corresponding to a wavelength of about 555 nanometres. The human eye, when adapted for bright conditions, is most sensitive near this frequency. Under these conditions, photopic vision dominates the visual perception of our eyes over scotopic vision. At other frequencies, more radiant intensity is required to achieve the same luminous intensity, according to the frequency response of the human eye. The luminous intensity for light of a particular wavelength λ is given by
$$I_\mathrm{v}(\lambda)= 683.002\ \mathrm{lm/W} \cdot \overline{y}(\lambda) \cdot I_\mathrm{e}(\lambda) ,$$
where I_{v}(λ) is the luminous intensity, I_{e}(λ) is the radiant intensity and $\textstyle \overline{y}(\lambda)$ is the photopic luminous efficiency function. If more than one wavelength is present (as is usually the case), one must integrate over the spectrum of wavelengths to get the total luminous intensity.

Luminous intensity is analogous to radiant intensity, but instead of simply adding up the contributions of every wavelength of light in the source's spectrum, the contribution of each wavelength is weighted by the luminous efficiency function, the model of the sensitivity of the human eye to different wavelengths, standardised by the CIE and ISO.

=== Examples ===
- A common candle emits light with roughly 1 cd luminous intensity. If emission in some directions is blocked by an opaque barrier, the emission would still be approximately one candela in the directions that are not obscured.
- A 25 W compact fluorescent light bulb puts out around 1700 lumens; if that light is radiated equally in all directions (i.e. over 4π steradians), it will have an intensity of $I_\text{V} = \frac{1700\ \text{lm}}{4 \pi\ \text{sr}} \approx 135\ \text{lm}/\text{sr} = 135\ \text{cd}.$
- Focused into a 20° beam (0.095 steradians), the same light bulb would have an intensity of around 18,000 cd or 18 kcd within the beam.

== History ==
Prior to 1948, various standards for luminous intensity were in use in a number of countries. These were typically based on the brightness of the flame from a "standard candle" of defined composition, or the brightness of an incandescent filament of specific design. One of the best-known of these was the English standard of candlepower. One candlepower was the light produced by a pure spermaceti candle weighing one sixth of a pound and burning at a rate of 120 grains per hour. Germany, Austria and Scandinavia used the Hefnerkerze, a unit based on the output of a Hefner lamp.

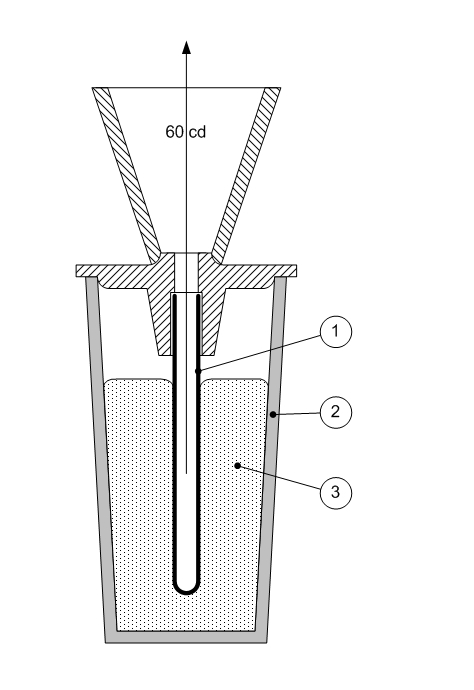
1=radiating tube of thorium dioxide; 2=melting pot; 3=solidifying platinum

A better standard for luminous intensity was needed. In 1884, Jules Violle had proposed a standard based on the light emitted by 1 cm^{2} of platinum at its melting point (or freezing point). The resulting unit of intensity, called the "violle", was roughly equal to 60 English candlepower. Platinum was convenient for this purpose because it had a high enough melting point, was not prone to oxidation, and could be obtained in pure form. Violle showed that the intensity emitted by pure platinum was strictly dependent on its temperature, and so platinum at its melting point should have a consistent luminous intensity.

In practice, realising a standard based on Violle's proposal turned out to be more difficult than expected. Impurities on the surface of the platinum could directly affect its emissivity, and in addition impurities could affect the luminous intensity by altering the melting point. Over the following half century various scientists tried to make a practical intensity standard based on incandescent platinum. The successful approach was to suspend a hollow shell of thorium dioxide with a small hole in it in a bath of molten platinum. The shell (cavity) serves as a black body, producing black-body radiation that depends on the temperature and is not sensitive to details of how the device is constructed.

In 1937, the Commission Internationale de l'Éclairage (International Commission on Illumination) and the CIPM proposed a "new candle" based on this concept, with value chosen to make it similar to the earlier unit candlepower. The decision was promulgated by the CIPM in 1946:

The value of the new candle is such that the brightness of the full radiator at the temperature of solidification of platinum is 60 new candles per square centimetre.

It was then ratified in 1948 by the 9th CGPM which adopted a new name for this unit, the candela. In 1967 the 13th CGPM removed the term "new candle" and gave an amended version of the candela definition, specifying the atmospheric pressure applied to the freezing platinum:

The candela is the luminous intensity, in the perpendicular direction, of a surface of 1 / 600,000 square metre of a black body at the temperature of freezing platinum under a pressure of 101,325 newtons per square metre.

In 1979, because of the difficulties in realising a Planck radiator at high temperatures and the new possibilities offered by radiometry, the 16th CGPM adopted a new definition of the candela:

The candela is the luminous intensity, in a given direction, of a source that emits monochromatic radiation of frequency 540×10^{12} hertz and that has a radiant intensity in that direction of 1/683 watt per steradian.

The definition describes how to produce a light source that (by definition) emits one candela, but does not specify the luminous efficiency function for weighting radiation at other frequencies. Such a source could then be used to calibrate instruments designed to measure luminous intensity with reference to a specified luminous efficiency function. An appendix to the SI Brochure makes it clear that the luminous efficiency function is not uniquely specified, but must be selected to fully define the candela.

The arbitrary (1/683) term was chosen so that the new definition would precisely match the old definition. Although the candela is now defined in terms of the second (an SI base unit) and the watt (a derived SI unit), the candela remains a base unit of the SI system, by definition.

The 26th CGPM approved the modern definition of the candela in 2018 as part of the 2019 revision of the SI, which redefined the SI base units in terms of fundamental physical constants.

== SI photometric light units ==
SI photometry quantities
| Quantity | | Unit | | Dimension (Note: The symbols in this column denote dimensions; "L", "T" and "J" are for length, time, and luminous intensity respectively, not the symbols for the units litre, tesla, and joule.) | Notes |
| Name | Symbol (Note: Standards organizations recommend that photometric quantities be denoted with a subscript "v" (for "visual") to avoid confusion with radiometric or photon quantities. For example: USA Standard Letter Symbols for Illuminating Engineering USAS Z7.1-1967, Y10.18-1967) | Name | Symbol | Dimension | Notes |
|---|---|---|---|---|---|
| Luminous energy | Q_{v} (Note: Alternative symbols sometimes seen: W for luminous energy, P or F for luminous flux, and ρ for luminous efficacy of a source.) | lumen second | lm⋅s | T⋅J | The lumen second is sometimes called the talbot. |
| Luminous flux, luminous power | Φ_{v} | lumen (= candela steradian) | lm (= cd⋅sr) | J | Luminous energy per unit time |
| Luminous intensity | I_{v} | candela (= lumen per steradian) | cd (= lm/sr) | J | Luminous flux per unit solid angle |
| Luminance | L_{v} | candela per square metre | cd/m^{2} (= lm/(sr⋅m^{2})) | L^{−2}⋅J | Luminous flux per unit solid angle per unit projected source area. The candela per square metre is sometimes called the nit. |
| Illuminance | E_{v} | lux (= lumen per square metre) | lx (= lm/m^{2}) | L^{−2}⋅J | Luminous flux incident on a surface |
| Luminous exitance, luminous emittance | M_{v} | lumen per square metre | lm/m^{2} | L^{−2}⋅J | Luminous flux emitted from a surface |
| Luminous exposure | H_{v} | lux second | lx⋅s | L^{−2}⋅T⋅J | Time-integrated illuminance |
| Luminous energy density | ω_{v} | lumen second per cubic metre | lm⋅s/m^{3} | L^{−3}⋅T⋅J | |
| Luminous efficacy (of radiation) | K | lumen per watt | lm/W | M^{−1}⋅L^{−2}⋅T^{3}⋅J | Ratio of luminous flux to radiant flux |
| Luminous efficacy (of a source) | η | lumen per watt | lm/W | M^{−1}⋅L^{−2}⋅T^{3}⋅J | Ratio of luminous flux to power consumption |
| Luminous efficiency, luminous coefficient | V | | | 1 | Luminous efficacy normalized by the maximum possible efficacy |
See also: SI; Photometry; Radiometry

=== Relationships between luminous intensity, luminous flux, and illuminance ===
If a source emits a known luminous intensity I_{v} (in candelas) in a well-defined cone, the total luminous flux Φ_{v} in lumens is given by
$$\Phi_\mathrm{v} = I_\mathrm{v} 2 \pi [1 - \cos(A/2)]$$
where A is the radiation angle of the lamp—the full vertex angle of the emission cone. For example, a lamp that emits 590 cd with a radiation angle of 40° emits about 224 lumens. See MR16 for emission angles of some common lamps.

If the source emits light uniformly in all directions, the flux can be found by multiplying the intensity by 4π: a uniform 1 candela source emits 4π lumens (approximately 12.566 lumens).

For the purpose of measuring illumination, the candela is not a practical unit, as it only applies to idealised point light sources, each approximated by a source small compared to the distance from which its luminous radiation is measured, also assuming that it is done so in the absence of other light sources. What gets directly measured by a light meter is incident light on a sensor of finite area, i.e. illuminance in lm/m^{2} (lux). However, if designing illumination from many point light sources, like light bulbs, of known approximate omnidirectionally uniform intensities, the contributions to illuminance from incoherent light being additive, it is mathematically estimated as follows. If r_{i} is the position of the ith source of uniform intensity I_{i}, and â is the unit vector normal to the illuminated elemental opaque area dA being measured, and provided that all light sources lie in the same half-space divided by the plane of this area,
$$\text{illuminance at point } \mathbf{r}\text{ on } dA\text{, } E_\mathrm v(\mathbf{r}) = \sum _{i}{ \frac{|\mathbf{\hat{a}}\cdot(\mathbf{r}-\mathbf{r}_i)|}{|\mathbf{r}-\mathbf{r}_i|^3} I_i }.$$
In the case of a single point light source of intensity I_{v}, at a distance r and normally incident, this reduces to
$$E_\mathrm{v} (r) = \frac{I_\mathrm v}{r^2}.$$

== SI multiples ==
Like other SI units, the candela can also be modified by adding a metric prefix that multiplies it by a power of 10, for example millicandela (mcd) for 10^{−3} candela.
