= Steradian =

SI derived unit of solid angle

steradian
- A graphical representation of two different steradians. The sphere has radius r, and in this case the area A of the highlighted spherical cap is r^{2}. The solid angle Ω equals [A/r^{2}] sr which is 1 sr in this example. The entire sphere has a solid angle of 4π sr.

General information
- Unit system: SI
- Unit of: solid angle
- Symbol: sr

Conversions
1 sr in ...	... is equal to ...
- SI base units: 1 m^{2}/m^{2}
- square degrees: 180^{2}/π^{2} deg^{2} ≈ 3282.8064 deg^{2}

The steradian (symbol: sr) or square radian is the unit of solid angle in the International System of Units (SI). It is used in three-dimensional geometry, and is analogous to the radian, which quantifies planar angles. A solid angle in the form of a circular cone can be projected onto a sphere from its centre, delineating a spherical cap where the cone intersects the sphere. The magnitude of the solid angle expressed in steradians is defined as the quotient of the surface area of the spherical cap and the square of the sphere's radius. This is analogous to the way a plane angle projected onto a circle delineates a circular arc on the circumference, whose length is proportional to the angle. Steradians can be used to measure a solid angle of any projected shape. The solid angle subtended is the same as that of a cone with the same projected area. A solid angle of one steradian subtends a cone aperture of approximately 1.144 radians or 65.54 degrees.

In the SI, solid angle is considered to be a dimensionless quantity, the ratio of the area projected onto a surrounding sphere and the square of the sphere's radius. This is the number of square radians in the solid angle. This means that the SI steradian is the number of square radians in a solid angle equal to one square radian, which of course is the number one. It is useful to distinguish between dimensionless quantities of a different kind, such as the radian (in the SI, a ratio of quantities of dimension length), so the symbol sr is used. For example, radiant intensity can be measured in watts per steradian (W⋅sr^{−1}). The steradian was formerly an SI supplementary unit, but this category was abolished in 1995 and the steradian is now considered an SI derived unit.

The name steradian is derived from the Greek στερεός stereos 'solid' + radian.

Solid angle of countries and other entities relative to the centre of Earth.

== Definition ==
A steradian can be defined as the solid angle subtended at the centre of a unit sphere by a unit area (of any shape) on its surface. For a general sphere of radius r, any portion of its surface with area A = r^{2} subtends one steradian at its centre.

A solid angle in the form of a circular cone is related to the area it cuts out of a sphere:
$$\Omega = \frac{A}{r^2}\ \text{sr} \, = \frac{2\pi h}{r}\ \text{sr},$$
where

- Ω is the solid angle
- A is the surface area of the spherical cap, 2πrh,
- r is the radius of the sphere,
- h is the height of the cap, and
- sr is the unit, steradian; sr = rad^{2}.

Because the surface area A of a sphere is 4πr^{2}, the definition implies that a sphere subtends 4π steradians (≈ 12.56637 sr) at its centre, or that a steradian subtends 1/4π ≈ 0.07958 of a sphere. By the same argument, the maximum solid angle that can be subtended at any point is 4π sr.

== Other properties ==
Section of cone (1) and spherical cap (2) that subtend a solid angle of one steradian inside a sphere

The area of a spherical cap is A = 2πrh, where h is the "height" of the cap. If A = r^{2}, then h/r = 1/2π. From this, one can compute the cone aperture (a plane angle) 2θ of the cross-section of a simple spherical cone whose solid angle equals one steradian:
$$\theta = \arccos \left( \frac{r-h}{r} \right) = \arccos \left( 1 - \frac{h}{r} \right) = \arccos \left( 1 - \frac{1}{2\pi} \right) ,$$
giving θ ≈ 0.572 rad = 32.77° and aperture 2θ ≈ 1.144 rad = 65.54°.

The solid angle of a spherical cone whose cross-section subtends the angle 2θ is
$$\Omega = 2\pi(1 - \cos\theta) \text{ sr} = 4\pi\sin^2\left(\frac{\theta}{2}\right) \text{ sr}.$$

A steradian is also equal to 1/4π of a complete sphere (spat), to (360°/2π)^{2} ≈ 3282.80635 square degrees, and to the spherical area of a polygon having an angle excess of 1 radian.

== SI multiples ==
Millisteradians (msr) and microsteradians (μsr) are occasionally used to describe light and particle beams. Other multiples are rarely used.

== See also ==
- n-sphere
- Spat (angular unit)
- IAU designated constellations by area

Linear/translational quantities				Angular/rotational quantities			
Dimensions	1	L	L^{2}	Dimensions	1	θ	θ^{2}
T	time: t s	absement: A m s		T	time: t s		
1		distance: d, position: r, s, x, displacement: d m	area: A m^{2}	1		angle: θ, angular displacement: θ rad	solid angle: Ω rad^{2}, sr
T^{−1}	frequency: f s^{−1}, Hz	speed: v, velocity: v m s^{−1}	kinematic viscosity: ν, specific angular momentum: h m^{2} s^{−1}	T^{−1}	frequency: f, rotational speed: n, rotational velocity: n s^{−1}, Hz	angular speed: ω, angular velocity: ω rad s^{−1}	
T^{−2}		acceleration: a m s^{−2}		T^{−2}	rotational acceleration s^{−2}	angular acceleration: α rad s^{−2}	
T^{−3}		jerk: j m s^{−3}		T^{−3}		angular jerk: ζ rad s^{−3}	
M	mass: m kg	weighted position: M ⟨x⟩ = ∑ m x	moment of inertia: I kg m^{2}	ML			
MT^{−1}	Mass flow rate: $\dot{m}$ kg s^{−1}	momentum: p, impulse: J kg m s^{−1}, N s	action: 𝒮, actergy: ℵ kg m^{2} s^{−1}, J s	MLT^{−1}		angular momentum: L, angular impulse: ΔL kg m rad s^{−1}	
MT^{−2}		force: F, weight: F_{g} kg m s^{−2}, N	energy: E, work: W, Lagrangian: L kg m^{2} s^{−2}, J	MLT^{−2}		torque: τ, moment: M kg m rad s^{−2}, N m	
MT^{−3}		yank: Y kg m s^{−3}, N s^{−1}	power: P kg m^{2} s^{−3}, W	MLT^{−3}		rotatum: P kg m rad s^{−3}, N m s^{−1}	
