= Hamerow =

Hamerow is a surname. Notable people with the surname include:

- Helena Hamerow (born 1971), American archaeologist
- Theodore S. Hamerow (1920–2013), American historian
