= Louise Holborn =

German-American political scientist

- Education: University of Heidelberg; Deutsche Hochschule für Politik; London School of Economics; Radcliffe College
- Awards: Nansen Refugee Award; Order of Merit of the Federal Republic of Germany
- Scientific career
- Fields: Political science
- Workplaces: Wellesley College; Pine Manor College; Smith College; Connecticut College

Louise Wilhelmine Holborn (8 August 1898, Charlottenburg – 1975, Orange City, Florida) was a German-American political scientist. She was a professor at Connecticut College from the late 1940s until 1970. She specialized in the politics of refugees and migration, conducting a number of studies on the topic for organizations like the United Nations, and she was also an advocate for refugees.

== Career ==
Holborn was born in Charlottenburg in 1898. The historian Hajo Holborn was Louise Holborn's brother, and their father was the physicist Ludwig Holborn. After graduating from high school, she became involved in social administration and the women's movement. In 1928, she enrolled at the University of Heidelberg, and she also studied at the Deutsche Hochschule für Politik (the German Academy for the Advanced Study of Political Science and Policy). After the rise of the Nazi Party, the rights of women as students and workers were curtailed, and rather than end her studies she instead emigrated to London and matriculated at the London School of Economics and Political Science. In 1934, she moved to the United States. There she studied at Radcliffe College, where she obtained a master's degree in 1936 and a doctorate in 1938. Her dissertation was on the work of Fridtjof Nansen with respect to refugees. Holborn taught at Wellesley College from 1939 to 1942, then Pine Manor College from 1942 to 1946, and at Smith College in 1946–1947. In 1947, she joined the Connecticut College for Women, where she became a tenured professor of political science. In 1946, Holborn edited the two volume book The War and Peace Aims of the United Nation; this series was found on the desk of Franklin D. Roosevelt at the time of his death.

In 1971, Holborn was the sole recipient of the Nansen Refugee Award, which is awarded annually by the United Nations High Commissioner for Refugees to an individual or group that has done outstanding service to the cause of refugees, displaced, or stateless people.

Holborn supplemented her academic work on the politics of refugees and immigration with advocacy and policy work for organizations like the U.S. Committee for Refugees and Immigrants and the International Refugee Organization. She also worked on refugee studies for the United Nations, and wrote UN reports on refugee situations in several continents. In 1956 she published a book with Oxford University Press, called The First High Commission for Refugees of the League of Nations. Holborn retired in 1970, but she continued to work as an instructor at Radcliffe College for several years. In 1974, she published Refugees, A Problem of Our Time: the Office of the United Nations High Commission for Refugees with Scarecrow Press. Holborn also collaborated with the political scientists Gwendolen M. Carter and John H. Herz on a successful textbook in comparative politics.

In January 1975, Holborn received the Officer's Cross of the Order of Merit, First Class, of the Federal Republic of Germany. She died later that same year. Holborn's papers are housed at the Schlesinger Library.

== Selected works ==
- The First High Commission for Refugees of the League of Nations (1956)
- Refugees, A Problem of Our Time: the Office of the United Nations High Commission for Refugees (1974)

== Selected awards ==
- Nansen Refugee Award, United Nations High Commissioner for Refugees (1971)
- Order of Merit of the Federal Republic of Germany, Officer's cross, first class (1975)
