= Reichsfeinde =

Pejorative term used in certain German historic eras

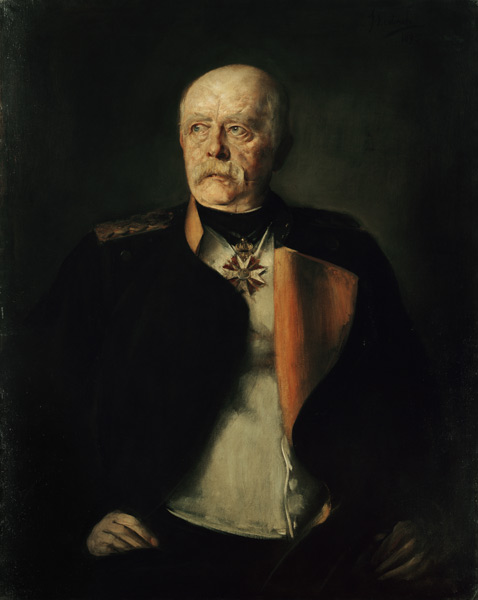
German chancellor Otto von Bismarck, who coined the term

Reichsfeinde (lit. 'enemies of the Reich') was a pejorative term used for groups which were in political opposition to the system of the German Reich during the tenure of Otto von Bismarck as chancellor of Germany and during the Nazi regime. Under Bismarck, the term was mainly employed against Catholics and Social Democrats to justify their political suppression. The Nazis added the Jewish people to this list of enemies and violently pursued their destruction for being "non-German".

== Imperial Germany ==
The German Empire was founded in 1871 after the defeat of France in the Franco-Prussian War, with France, as a result, being perceived as the main foreign enemy of the new Reich. The external enemy of France was contrasted with the internal Reichsfeinde: Any societal or political forces that did not want to conform to the Protestant nation-state. Besides Catholics and the Labour movement, this also included national minorities such as the Danes, the Poles, the Alsace-Lorrainians (who voted for minority protest parties until 1890 in Reichstag elections), and adherents of the Guelph Party, who opposed the 1867 Prussian annexation of Hanover. Quickly, this was also extended to the German Jews. All of these groups were stigmatised as "un-German", they were accused of being unreliable and of undermining (and thereby weakening) national unity. A large part of the population of the empire was thus pushed out of imperial affairs; in the 1881 German federal election, the parties marked as Reichsfeinde by Bismarck achieved, according to American historian Otto Pflanze, a two-thirds majority.

Central targets of Bismarck's persecution constituted political Catholicism and the Centre Party on one side, and the Labour movement on the other, with the latter unifying in 1875 through the merger of the General German Workers' Association (ADAV) and the Marxist Social Democratic Workers' Party (SDAP), forming the Socialist Workers' Party of Germany (SAP). The Catholic population of the empire was accused of not being primarily loyal the newly founded state, but rather to the pope. The Social Democrats were accused of being internationalists, since Karl Marx wrote in the Communist Manifesto in 1848: "The working men have no fatherland." They were thusly called "vaterlandslose Gesellen", meaning "fellows without a fatherland". (Note: Geselle in German describes a blue-collar worker who has finished a three-year apprenticeship and passed his Gesellenprüfung, an exam to bear that title.) The leading Social Democrats August Bebel and Wilhelm Liebknecht were sentenced to two years custodia honesta (Festungshaft) for opposing the German annexation of Alsace-Lorraine, which was viewed as high treason, in 1872. Bismarck declared in a speech in the Prussian House of Lords on 24 April 1873, that the state was "threatened in its very foundation" and thus "forced to self-defence", as two parties were "undertaking their activities against national development in an international manner":

In my opinion, against these two parties, all parties that wish to strengthen the state element and have the defensiveness of the state at heart against those who attack and threaten it must stand together, and therefore, all those parties who wish to retain and defend the state must work together.

=== Kulturkampf ===
The first "internal battlefield" of this conflict was the Kulturkampf. It constituted a confrontation between the Catholic Church and the secular state, which was observable in several European countries in the 19th century. The church claimed a monopoly on truth in its battle against rationalisation, secularisation and other aspects of modernisation: The First Vatican Council in 1870 had declared the doctrine of Papal infallibility, according to which the pope, as long as he spoke ex cathedra, was infallible. Liberals strongly protested this declaration. Bismarck was particularly worried that Catholic priests would support the Polish national movement in the Prussian provinces of Posen and West Prussia. The Prussian and later the Reich governments passed a series of laws and decrees, starting in 1872, which placed schools under state supervision and introduced civil marriage. Furthermore, political messages by priests "from the pulpit" were forbidden (Kanzelparagraf), evictions of priests from the country were made possible, and the Jesuit Order was banned.

The Kulturkampf started in the summer of 1871 with a media campaign initiated by Bismarck in different newspapers, starting with the Kreuzzeitung. A Catholic priest complained that Catholics had to read daily about being "an enemy of the fatherland, a Roman [Römling, pejorative] and an idiot, and that his clergy was the scum of humanity." Bismarck first accused the Catholics of being Reichsfeinde on 30 January 1872 in a debate in the Prussian House of Representatives about the introduction of state supervision over the schooling system: Here, he first attacked the Centre Party directly. He accused the party of "mobilising against the state", since it also took in Protestants that "had nothing in common with the party, except being hostile to the German Empire and Prussia". The party had "found acceptance and respect from all parties, be they national or revolutionary, that were hostile to the state." The Centre Party newspaper Germania expressed solidarity with the clerical newspapers of Southern Germany, which Bismarck denounced as "the anti-German French press", as "the old press of the Confederation of the Rhine in Catholic clothing". The Liberal press agreed on many of these statements and joined in denouncing the Catholic press. The weekly newspaper Das Neue Reich applauded the banning of the Jesuits in 1875: According to them, it was "high time to intervene against these parasites, just as one would against Grape phylloxera, Colorado beetles and other Reichsfeinde."

In the mid-1870s, all Catholic bishops in Germany were either in exile or under arrest, but the power of political Catholicism remained unbroken: In the 1874 German federal election, the Centre Party doubled its votes relative to the 1871 German federal election. From 1880 onwards, Bismarck was supported by the party, leading to the laws passed during the Kulturkampf being rescinded or made less severe. The conflict ended fully in 1886/1887 with several "peace laws". However, the cultural split between the Protestant majority and the Catholic minority remained. The historian Heinrich August Winkler summarised: "They were [...] no longer marked as Reichsfeinde, but they could have held no illusions about the fact that prejudice survived much longer than paragraphs."

=== Anti-Socialist Laws ===
Towards the end of the 1870s, Bismarck started attacks against the Social Democrats, whom he distrusted due to their open demand of proletarian revolution: After several attempts failed to limit the freedom of speech of the "red Reichsfeinde" through new press laws and the introduction of the criminal offense of "incitement of class hatred" in 1874 and 1875, two assassination attempts on Wilhelm I in 1878 gave a pretext for a snap election and the passage of the (Anti-)Socialist Laws. All Social Democratic, Socialist and Communist organisations, assemblies and publications were banned, agitators were liable to be deported, and "endangered districts" could be placed under a state of siege. A total of 330 Social Democratic associations were banned, around a 1000 pamphlets seized, and a total of 1500 years of jail time meted out. Only the Social Democratic deputies in the Reichstag were left mostly unharmed and could continue to be elected, as they enjoyed the privilege of parliamentary immunity. Bismarck justified these measures as "self-defence". The official aim was to "save society from murderers and arsonists, from the experience of the Paris Commune." In fact, August Bebel had described that uprising as a "prelude battle" in 1871, which would cause an eruption of the entire European proletariat. The Centre Party agreed with Bismarck's anti-Socialist tendencies, but was reserved about the law, as its subject matter appeared to them as too ill-defined. The Reichstag deputy Peter Reichensperger compared it to the Carlsbad Decrees on 16 September 1878:

I have no idea who, after voting for this present bill, can still consider himself as protected [...]. Depending on how the streams of the present moment are floating, depending on how positions of opposition are uttered, the word "Reichsfeinde", which has already been so terribly been spreading and has caused so much damage, would be applied here as well.

Three days later, the Reichstag passed the law with a large majority. However, this aim of Bismarck also did not achieve its goal: The Social Democrats founded front organisations such as singing clubs and relief funds, Social Democratic literature was printed in Switzerland and then smuggled into Germany, the electoral gains of the SAP increased steadily after 1884, and in 1890, the party became the largest by number of votes, achieving 19.7% of the popular vote. After Bismarck's dismissal, the Anti-Socialist Laws were no longer extended. Bismarck's hatred for the SPD remained: In 1893, he explained to an American journalist: "They are the rats of this country and should be eradicated." The severity of the discrimination against the Social Democrats throughout the whole imperial period was anecdotally described by historian Walter Mühlhausen: In 1913, the then-chancellor Theobald von Bethmann Hollweg held a short conversation with August Bebel, who was then on his death bed. The SPD chairman subsequently realised that this was "the first time, that a member of the government has spoken to [him] outside of official negotiations."

=== Poles ===
The Poles living in the empire were also labelled as Reichsfeinde. This occurred in relation to the Kulturkampf, which, according to Norman Davies, turned "every Polish Catholic instantly into a potential rebel." Those Poles who inhabited the Western territories of post-partition Poland were, after 1871, no longer citizens of a multi-ethnic Prussia, but of a German nation-state. Bismarck was distrustful towards them: In August 1871, he named the aims of his policies as "fighting against the Ultramontanist party, especially in the Polish territories." He believed that religious education by Catholic priests in those regions would lead to a rise of Polish nationalism, intending to abolish it altogether. In 1872, the Prussian Minister of Culture Adalbert Falk decreed that at all post-primary schools, religion as a subject had to be conducted in the German language. This had both an anti-Catholic and an anti-Polish intent. Discrimination continued until the end of the empire: After 1886, tens of thousands of Poles with unclear, or with Russian or Austrian citizenship, were deported, even if their families had lived at their homes for generations. The Prussian Settler Commission, founded in 1886, was intended to increase the number of Germans in the provinces of West Prussia and Posen, in 1907, the Reichstag passed a law that allowed for the expropriation of Polish landowners, and in 1901, the language dispute escalated into a school strike at Wreschen. The measures enacted by the Prussian government violated the 1850 Prussian constitution, which guaranteed the legal equality of all citizens in Article 4. Germanisation was not a success. According to Hans-Ulrich Wehler, however, the measures made the German citizenry feel familiar with the fact that there could be "second-class citizens".

=== An "Association of Reichsfeinde" ===
After turning towards a more conservative political base in 1878, Bismarck counted the left-leaning Liberals of the German Progress Party (DFP) as Reichsfeinde, since, while supporting the Kulturkampf laws, they were opposed to the Anti-Socialist Laws. In his eyes, they were "crypto-Republicans" and nihilists, and had a limited view beyond their desire for progress. Since many Jews voted for the left-leaning Liberals, this polemic also had an antisemitic aspect.

From the 1880s on, Bismarck described a cooperation between all Reichsfeinde: In 1881, he accused the Centre Party politician Ludwig Windthorst of also supporting the Social Democrats, the Guelph Party as well as the Polish and Alsatian minority parties. He further explained that the harsh measures against Catholicism had been necessary as it was connected to the Polish population "with national-revolutionary aims, in a chemical bond, so to say." In 1885 he predicted that the Jesuits would eventually start leading the Social Democrats. Later on, he expanded the circle of alleged Reichsfeinde and concoted a conspiracy theory in relation to an affair pertaining to the Hamburg politician Friedrich Heinrich Geffcken: In a press statement on 3 October 1888, he accused Geffcken of being a Guelph particularist, who belonged to an "association of Reichsfeinde" in union with the Catholics, Social Democrats, left-leaning Liberals and the national minorities. He explained: "The task these people have made for themselves is the destruction of all that exists presently. They are directing their ambitions against the Protestant Prussian empire." Geffcken, he alleged, had supported the occupation of German territory by French troops: "All Reichsfreunde [friends of the Reich] would have to stand together against these people."

Bismarck himself did not believe that the threat he imagined in his conspiracy theory existed: For instance, he did not believe that the Social Democrats could actually pose a revolutionary threat to his government, mainly because of their utopian aims. He even believed that they would be "better" than the Liberals of the DFP. After Bismarck's dismissal, the polemics against the Catholic and Social Democrat Reichsfeinde lessened. A more formal end to the persecution marked Wilhelm II's speech in the Reichstag on 4 August 1914, at the start of World War I, in which he declared that he no longer saw parties, but "only Germans". This was understood as an offer to former Reichsfeinde to more strongly participate in political decision-making.

=== Interpretations ===
There are different explanations and interpretations for why Bismarck persecuted the Reichsfeinde. Hans-Ulrich Wehler analysed Bismarck's attacks as a form of "negative integration", a method of ruling in which the "in-group" is contrasted with the "out-group", with the latter having to appear threatening without actually threatening the system as a whole. Bismarck applied this to the pro-state majority as an "in-group" and the Reichsfeinde as the threatening "out-group". He conjured up the threat of these minorities to keep his coalition of Reichsfreunde intact. Through this, Bismarck was able to keep up a "Bonapartist semi-dictatorship" with himself at the helm. He intended to force the internal homogeneity of the young German nation-state by presenting himself as the "saviour" from "sinister Ultramontanism and Socialist revolutionaries", positioning himself as a charismatic ruler. Yet, on the other hand, Wehler argues that the discrimination against the Reichsfeinde hurt national unity: "In all, it appeared as though the dogmatically Protestant Bildungsbürger or other bourgeois who was attacking Ultramontanists and Social Democrats was the only acceptable type of nationally thinking German."

The linguist Szilvia Odenwald-Varga argues that the constant conjuring of alleged interior and exterior threats to the Reich served the "integration of the state collective": In changing coalitions, Bismarck attempted to work, at points, with the Conservatives, then again with the Liberals, in the 1860s even attempting to work with the socialist Ferdinand Lassalle of the ADAV. According to Odenwald-Varga, he fought the Reichsfeinde and then attempted to, at least partially, win them over for his policies. The historian Dieter Langewiesche opines that the main aim here was the formation of a national identity: Through the persecution and discrimination of enemies, a self-image of the Germans was created. That integrative force of nationalism resulting from these measures was soon strong enough to deconstruct many domestic differences.

According to American historian Otto Pflanze, the repressive tactics applied against the Ultramontanist Catholics and the Social Democrats with the aim of building a national consensus proved counter-productive: Bismarck overestimated the binding force of dynastic loyalty and German patriotism. On the flip side, he underestimated the extent of alienation that those whom he attacked felt, and that the moral force of the religious and social ideals of the persecutees, as well as their will to resist, as strengthened through the persecutions. The sharp words that Bismarck regularly used, Pflanze argues, show a form of "narcissistic anger":

Whoever was against him, for whatever reason, be it in parliament or at court, was soon branded a Reichsfeind. Support was equated with patriotism, opposition with treason.

=== Antisemitism ===
The discrimination against Catholics and Social Democrats as Reichsfeinde decreased after 1890. Ethnically defined groups, mainly the Jews, continued to be stigmatised as such. An author of the Catholic Germania newspaper opined during the Berlin antisemitism controversy in 1879, that "no one had more fervently and outrageously used the terms of Reichsfeind and Staatsfeind than many Jews." Those were, according to that same article: "In their spiritual traits and the character of their customs still a separate race [...], the assimilation of which has not yet succeeded, and perhaps might never succeed." The developing antisemitism in Germany understood the German Empire as a Volksnation, a racial unit, to which Jews could never belong. Furthermore, similarly to how Bismarck labelled Social Democrats and Catholics, they were accused of having conflicting loyalties, be it to being the Chosen People or to "international capital", that was allegedly Jewish-dominated. Jewish industrialists and politicians like Walther Rathenau complained in 1911, that, until proven otherwise, most Germans would believe in the loyalty of all national minorities, however regarding the Jews: "They are accused, without any evidence, as anti-Nationalist", and having to justify themselves:

The Jew is supposed to rid himself through baptism. Rid himself of what? His family? His religion? No: of his nation. Where does it lie? [...] What would the German Catholics answer if it was demanded of them to convert to Protestantism as proof of them ridding themselves of foreign religious organisations?

Several antisemites used Bismarckian discourse to postulate a "trias of Reichsfeinde", consisting of Social Democrats, Catholics and Jews. The nationalist Pan-German League continuously warned of an alleged fundamental threat through the internal Reichsfeinde (Social Democrats, Jews, Catholics and representatives of the national minorities) as well as external threats (Great Britain, France, Russia). The Pan-Germans usually claimed Bismarck as their reference point.

In reality, Bismarck had never described the Jews as Reichsfeinde. The publicist Otto Glagau attempted to retroactively brand them as such in his pamphlet Des Reiches Noth und der neue Culturkampf ("The Hardships of the Empire and the New Kulturkampf") in 1879: Protestants and Catholics should make peace and fight against the Jews as the "real Reichsfeinde". After Bismarck was dismissed, antisemitic publisher Max Brewer criticised Wilhelm II and the new chancellor Leo von Caprivi as, according to Brewer, they "played right into the hands" of the domestic Reichsfeinde, particularly the Jews. The antisemites were strongly opposed by the public, their parties at most received 350.000 votes in imperial elections. Silently, however, the antisemitic exclusionary thinking crept into conservative and liberal circles, without it being publicly expressed.

== Weimar Republic ==
After the defeat of Germany in World War I and the German Revolution of 1918–1919 in 1918, the former Reichsfeinde became the essential supporting parties of the Weimar Republic. SPD, Centre Party and left-leaning liberal DDP formed the Weimar Coalition of parties loyal to the constitution. This made them a target for hostilities, often with antisemitic undertones. The Reichsfeinde were made responsible for the defeat in the war in the Stab-in-the-back myth by the far-right anti-Republican parties.

Aside from this, the explicit term Reichsfeinde only played a role towards the end of the republic, as president Paul von Hindenburg was disgruntled over the fact that chancellor Heinrich Brüning had made Hindenburg's reelection possible only with the votes of the SPD and the Centre Party, the former Reichsfeinde of Bismarck. Soon after, he dropped Brüning and governed through a series of presidential cabinets. The historian Konrad Repgen explained the fact that the Centre Party voted for the Enabling Act of 24 March 1933 as a late after-effect of the Kulturkampf: "The old stigma of being a Reichsfeind, of being a second-class citizen, had continued to be present in silence. The Catholics no longer wanted to be excluded from the national community, they – finally – wanted to be part thereof."

== Nazi Germany ==
The Nazi regime used the dual terminology of Volks- und Staatsfeinde, meaning "enemies of the people and state", to mark, discriminate and persecute Communists, Social Democrats, members of the Labour movement, the German resistance overall, politically active priests, Freemasons, Jews and the Romani. The term Reichsfeinde resurfaced with the "Decree of the Führer and chancellor regarding the usage of confiscated Reichsfeinde assets" of 29 May 1941, which transferred confiscated properties of opposition and resistance groups that had been seized by the German states and Nazi Party Gaue to the Reich. The State Secretary in the Reich Ministry of the Interior, Hans Pfundtner, argued: "Whoever acts as an enemy of the people or the state, does not act against the states, but against the people and the Reich." "Enemies of the people and the state" were now synonymously used with Reichsfeinde.

Differing from Bismarck, the Nazis used the term Reichsfeinde not just as a descriptor for perceived or real enemies of their own policies, but as a racial-Völkisch classification. Reinhard Heydrich, head of the Reich Main Security Office (RSHA) decreed before the German invasion of Poland that it was the task of the SS Einsatzgruppen, which were to follow the Wehrmacht advance, to "combat all anti-German elements and Reichsfeinde enemy territory behind the fighting army". Before the Balkan campaign, he specified that Jews and communists were to be understood as Reichsfeinde. On 2 July 1940, he noted that, once the German invasion of the Soviet Union had started, the Einsatzgruppen were to "deal heavy blows against Reichsfeinde throughout the world in the categories of emigrants, Freemasons, Jews and political-religious enemies, and of the Second and Third Internationale." In verbal orders to the Einsatzgruppen, the term "liquidation" was used, meaning to kill those who the SS got their hands on. The number of people murdered on Soviet territory by the Einsatzgruppen is estimated to be at least half a million. This is also about the same number of German Jews that were deported to ghettos and extermination camps and died there. Their assets fell to the Reich.

== See also ==
- Kulturkampf
- Anti-Socialist Laws
