= Disappearing-filament pyrometer =

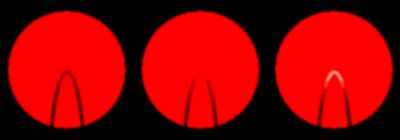
The filament will seem to "disappear" into the background when glowing at a matching temperature, hence the name.

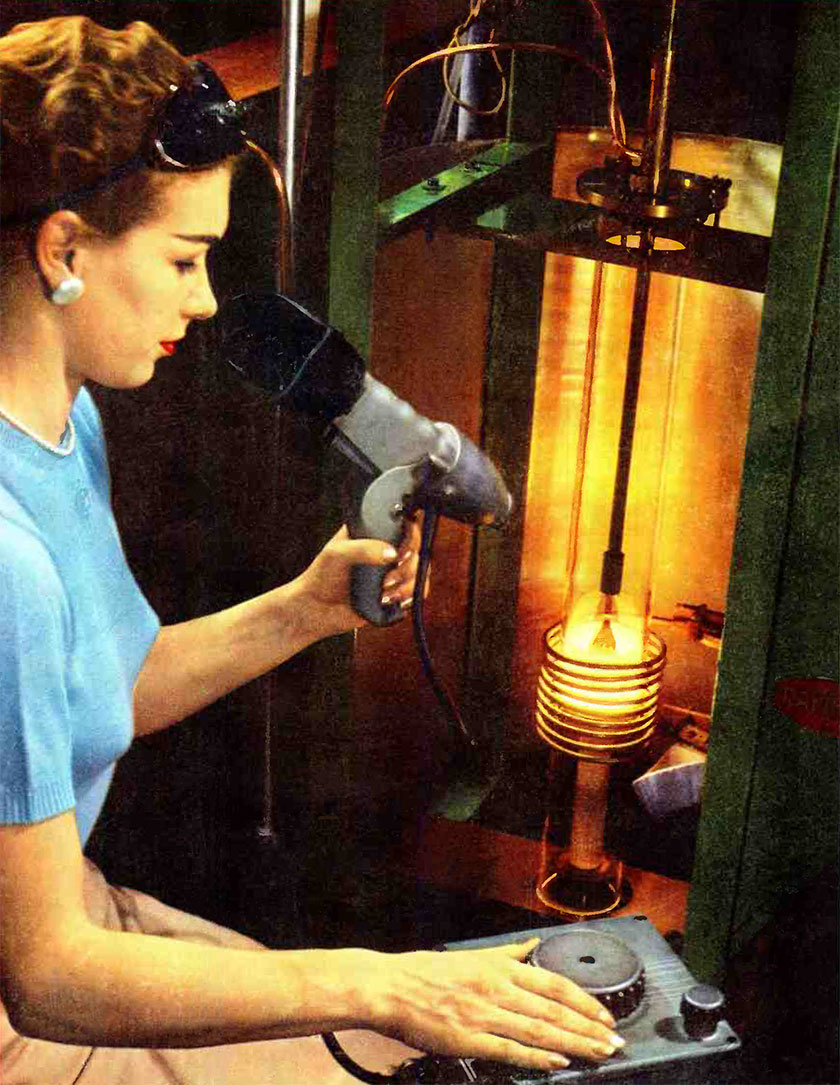
Technician measuring the temperature of molten silicon at 2650°F with a disappearing-filament pyrometer, in Czochralski crystal growing equipment at Raytheon transistor plant in 1956. The knob she is turning (bottom right) controls current through the filament.

The disappearing-filament pyrometer is an optical pyrometer, in which the temperature of a glowing incandescent object is measured by comparing it to the light of a heated filament. Invented independently in 1901 by Ludwig Holborn and Ferdinand Kurlbaum in Germany and Everett Fleet Morse in the United States, it was the first device which could measure temperatures above 1000 °C. Disappearing filament pyrometers have been used to measure temperatures between about 600 °C and 3000 °C. Like other optical pyrometers they are used to measure the temperature of objects too hot for contact thermometers, such as molten metals. Widely used in the steel and ceramics industries as well as for research, they have been almost totally superseded by electronic spectral-band pyrometers.

The simplest design has optics like a Keplerian telescope. A thin wire (filament), placed at the focal plane of the objective lens, is heated by electric current. When seen through the eyepiece, the wire appears silhouetted in front of the hot luminous object under investigation. The user compares the brightness of the glowing filament with the object behind, and adjusts the current through the filament until it seems to "disappear" in front of the glowing object. At that point the filament and object are at the same temperature. The user then reads the temperature off the filament current control dial, which is calibrated by the filament's current-vs-temperature curve. or in some instruments from a current-vs-temperature table.

The filament seems to "disappear" against the background of the object because two objects at the same temperature have the same black-body spectrum.

In other designs the current through the filament is kept constant, and the radiation allowed through from the target object is varied with calibrated attenuating wedges in the optical path, or a prism is used to place the images of the target object and a calibrated glowing surface next to each other, e.g. as a disk inside a ring.

Many disappearing-filament pyrometers use a red filter. The combination of the filter and the human eye's response only allows through a narrow band of red wavelengths, so the luminosity comparison is made over only a narrow band of wavelengths. This reduces errors due to the target and filament not having identical emission spectra. For very hot objects, additional filters can be used to protect the eye from excessive light. The resolution of the instrument depends somewhat on the operator, but with a skilled operator a resolution of 10 °C for temperatures up to 2000 °C can be achieved.

Disappearing-filament pyrometers can be used only if the object under study emits visible light similar to a hot black body; this means that its temperature must be high enough (around 600 °C and up) and the object must not be fully transparent or highly reflective. For good accuracy, the object should appear dark gray or black when cold.

== See also ==
- Mirror galvanometer
- Glossmeter
