= Ernst Jäckh =

German journalist, diplomat, author, academic, and Turkophile

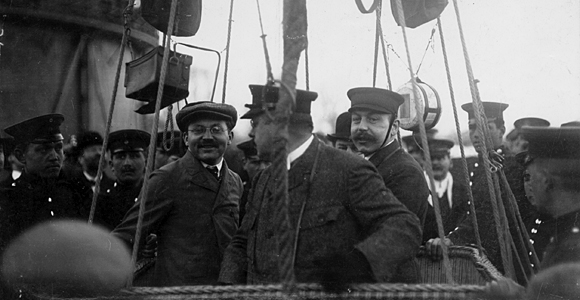
- Ernst Jäckh (right), March 14, 1909
- Born: February 22, 1875; Urach, German Empire
- Died: August 17, 1959 (aged 84); New York City, United States
- Other names: Ernest Jackh, Ernest Jaeckh, Ernst Jäckh
- Education: Ph.D. Philology, 1902
- Occupations: Journalist, Orientalist, Political Scientist
- Employer(s): Neckar-Zeitung (Heilbronn), Deutscher Werkbund, Nachrichtenstelle für den Orient, Deutsche Hochschule für Politik, New Commonwealth Institute, Columbia University

Ernst Jäckh (February 22, 1875 – August 17, 1959) was a German journalist, diplomat, author, and academic who later lived in Great Britain and the United States. He is most known for having advocated for first Germany, and then the United States, having better relations with Turkey. He was the founder and leader of the Deutsche Hochschule für Politik in Berlin from 1920 to 1933.

== Early life and education ==
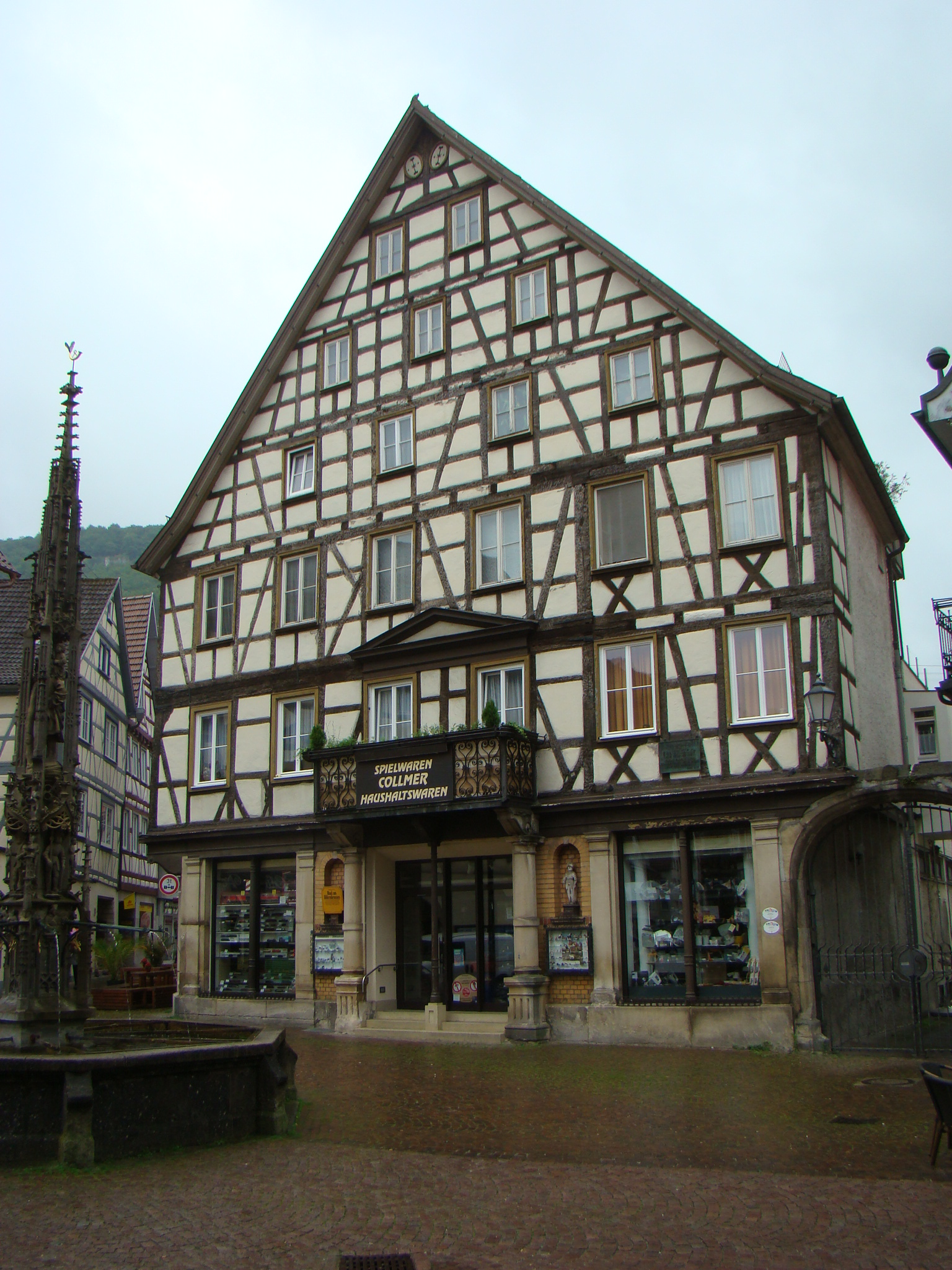
Jäckh's birthplace at Röhrenbrunnen in Bad Urach

Jäckh was born in Urach, Germany.

His secondary education was at the theological seminaries of Maulbronn and Blaubeuren and at technical school in Stuttgart. He then was a student at the University of Breslau, the University of Geneva, the Ludwig-Maximilians-Universität München, and Heidelberg University. He studied philosophy, politics, and history, focusing in particular on Turkey and the Middle East.

== Career in Germany ==
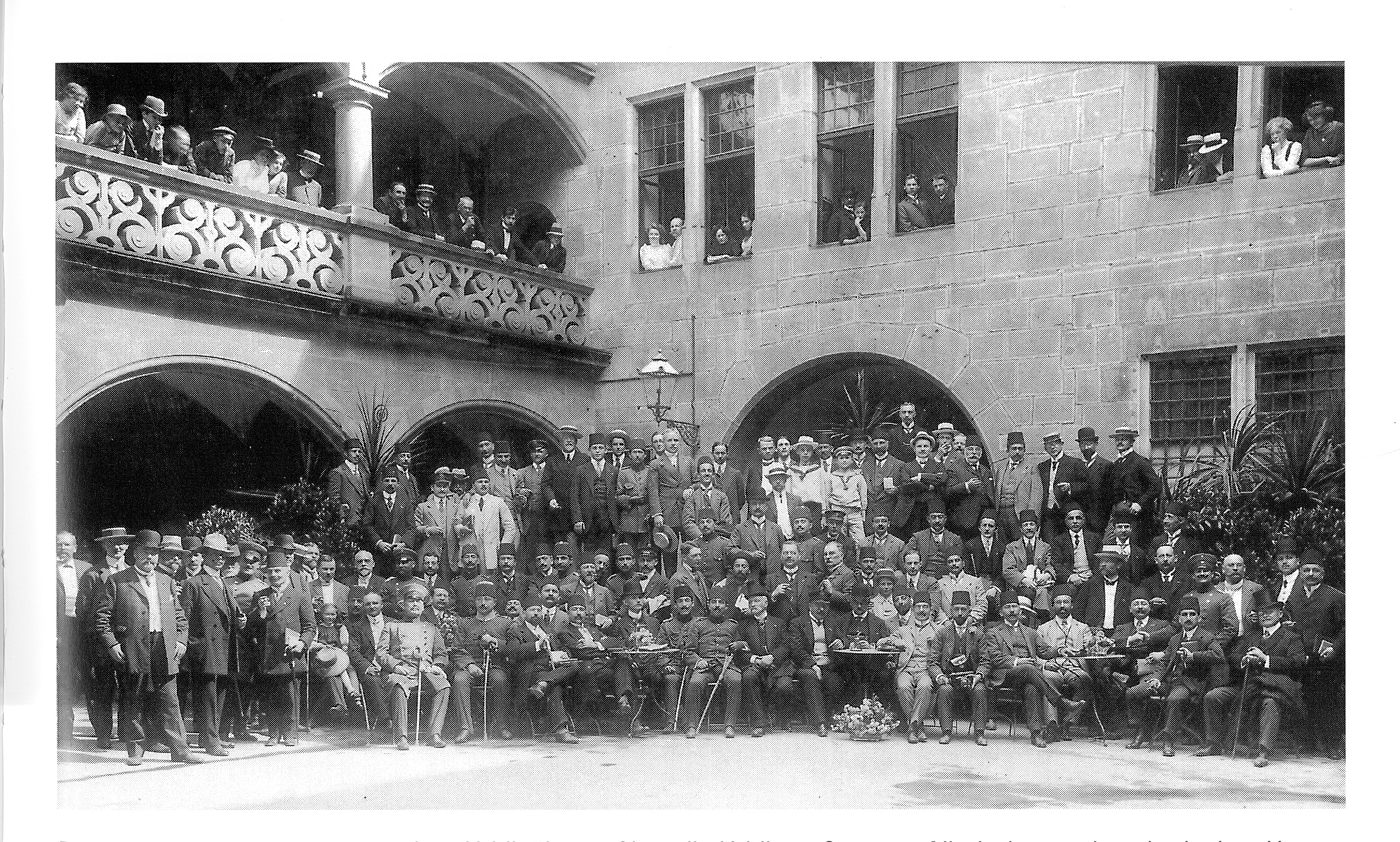
Ernst Jäckh and the Turkish study commission in Heilbronn, on July 8, 1911. Jäckh stands in the middle in the background (behind him the lamp attached to the wall), with the hat taken off in his right hand.

A journalist during his early years, Jäckh worked as an editor for the paper Neckar-Zeitung in Heilbronn.

Under the overall guidance of pastor and politician Friedrich Naumann, Jäckh was a key organizer of the liberal movement in Germany during the early years of the twentieth century.

Starting in 1908, Jäckh promoted the German-Turkish Alliance, and he founded the German Turkish Association in 1912. His book Der aufsteigende Halbmond, published in 1911, sought to explain contemporary Turkey to a German readership and further the prospects of alliance between the two countries. He became a professor of Turkish history at the Friedrich Wilhelm University of Berlin starting in 1914.

Ernst Jäckh played an active role in German diplomatic efforts during the First World War, although was never officially part of the German Foreign Office. During the war, Jaeckh was engaged in putting out propaganda in favor of the German-Turkish alliance (and trying to instigate actions that would undercut the British in the Middle East), with historian Fritz Fischer characterizing him as "the most important propagandist of Germany's eastern policy." Historian Margaret Lavinia Anderson describes Jäckh as "a diminutive journalist with a supersized gift for self-promotion" who marketed the Ottoman Empire as "the land of tolerance" while Ottoman Armenians were being systematically murdered.

Jäckh suffered a personal loss when his only son, 18-year-old Hans, was killed in action in September 1918, on the Chemin des Dames, during the Second Battle of the Marne. The death, coupled with the demise of the German Empire, changed his thinking about the nature of international relations.

In 1920, the Deutsche Hochschule für Politik was founded by Jäckh, who served as its president and initial director. During the 1920s, it was considered Berlin's best school for the study of political behavior. The Hochschule benefited from Jäckh's abilities to fit in with both liberal and conservative factions and act as a consensus builder. He gave lecture tours in America, made contacts there, and secured funding for the Hochschule's library and publications from the Carnegie Endowment for International Peace and the Rockefeller Foundation. As the decade went on, Jäckh promoted the idea of a "New Germany", one that was democratic and internationalist in perspective.

Jäckh, like other German academics, witnessed first-hand the demise of the Weimar Republic and the rise to power of the Nazi Party. While some of the academics perceived immediately the reality of the Nazis, Jäckh did not. Long an advocate of a "New Germany", and with an internationalist perspective in which he saw himself as an unofficial ambassador for his country in international dealings, Jäckh continued this approach even after the Machtergreifung in January 1933. Indeed in public statements and a private letter to Hitler, he maintained that a continuity was possible between the liberalism of Naumann and the national socialism of the new regime. His attempts at accommodation with the Nazis were to little avail, however, as the Hochschule underwent a political purge, lost its independence, and was put under control of the Reich Ministry of Public Enlightenment and Propaganda later during 1933.

== Career in Britain ==
At this point in 1933, Jäckh, together with his wife Marta, left Germany for Britain. In London, he became international director of the newly founded New Commonwealth Society, which had been created in 1932 by David Davies, 1st Baron Davies and which advocated the creation of an international tribunal and an international police force. Jäckh worked with the German branch of the society, which at first had close ties to the Nazi Party; but subsequently, the Nazis grew suspicious of both the branch and of Jäckh, reporting that Jäckh was a "highly murky personality" and that he was "married to a Jew" and thus could not be relied upon to represent German interests in international settings.

Jäckh became a British citizen and represented the British Foreign office on trips he took to Turkey and Europe. When the Second World War started in 1939, Jäckh was named head of the Southeastern Division of the British Ministry of Information.

== Career in the United States ==
In 1940, he migrated further to the United States where he became Professor of Public Law and Government at Columbia University, focusing on the politics of the regions of Germany, the Balkans, and the Middle East. He published the book The Rising Crescent: Turkey Yesterday, Today and Tomorrow in 1944; his aim was to explain modern Turkey to American readers and to foster improvement in Turkey–United States relations. The New York Times Book Review made reference to "Dr. Jackh's distinguished reputation as an interpreter of Turkey's policies" and found "his frank special pleading for Turkey disarming and persuasive."

He served on the Columbia faculty until 1946. Jäckh then became a consultant at Columbia's School of International Affairs, in particular for the school's Near and Middle East Institute which he had helped found. He lived in Morningside Heights, Manhattan. He was one of the key co-founders of the American Turkish Society in 1949.

Jäckh published his memoirs, entitled Der goldene Pflug: Lebensernte eines Weltbürgers, in 1954. He died in New York City on August 17, 1959, at the age of 84.

== Legacy ==
As an academic, Jäckh has not been highly regarded in terms of scholarship or original thought. Author Sevil Özçalık states that "Jäckh's reputation was largely self-created throughout his career, which also favorably shaped other people's perception of him."

This reputation was maintained to the end of his life, with obituaries of him hailing his claimed opposition to the Nazi regime. But the progressive, democratic reputation that the Deutsche Hochschule für Politik had enjoyed for decades became diminished as a result of scholarly research performed in the latter part of the twentieth century, which showed that the Hochschule's relationship with the Nazi Party was not the one of pure opposition that had been portrayed. With these findings, Jäckh's reputation in connection to his role there suffered substantially as well.

== Published works ==
Jäckh wrote some twenty-one books, including some under the name Ernest Jackh. His books include:

- Albanian War
- Der Austeigende Halbmonde
- Background of the Middle East
- Deutschland im Orient
- The War for Man's Soul (1943)
- The Rising Crescent (Farrar & Rinehart, 1944)

== Sources ==
- Anderson, Margaret Lavinia (2011). "Who Still Talked about the Extermination of the Armenians?". In Suny, Ronald Grigor; Göçek, Fatma Müge; Naimark, Norman M. (eds.). A Question of Genocide: Armenians and Turks at the End of the Ottoman Empire. Oxford University Press. pp. 199–220. ISBN 978-0-19-979276-4.
- Eisfeld, Rainer (2014). "From the Berlin Political Studies Institute to Columbia and Yale: Ernest Jaeckh and Arnold Wolfers". In Rösch, Felix (ed.). Émigré Scholars and the Genesis of International Relations: A European Discipline in America?. Basingstoke, Hampshire: Palgrave Macmillan. pp. 113–131.
- Kaplan, Fred (1983). The Wizards of Armageddon. Stanford, California: Stanford University Press.
- Korenblat, Steven D. (September 2006). "A School for the Republic? Cosmopolitans and Their Enemies at the Deutsche Hochschule Für Politik, 1920–1933". Central European History. 39 (3): 394–430. doi:10.1017/S0008938906000148. S2CID 144221659.
- Özçalık, Sevil (2018). Promoting an Alliance, Furthering Nationalism: Ernst Jäckh and Ahmed Emin in the Time of the First World War. Berlin: Klaus Schwarz Verlag.
- Weber, Peter (2019). "Ernst Jäckh and the National Internationalism of Interwar Germany". Central European History. 52 (3): 402–423. doi:10.1017/S0008938919000761. ISSN 0008-9389. S2CID 204373771.
