= Eisfeld (surname) =

Eisfeld is a German surname. Notable people with the surname include:

- Rainer Eisfeld (born 1941), German political scientist and writer
- Theodore Eisfeld (1816–1882), American conductor
- Thomas Eisfeld (born 1993), German footballer
- Walter Eisfeld (1905–1940), German Nazi SS concentration camp commandant
