= Friedrich Meinecke =

German historian (1862–1954)

- Born: October 30, 1862; Salzwedel, Saxony, Kingdom of Prussia
- Died: February 6, 1954 (aged 91); West Berlin, West Germany
- Education: University of Bonn; University of Berlin
- Occupations: Historian; Archivist (1887–1901) of the German State Archives; Editor (1896–1935) of the Historische Zeitschrift; Chairman (1928–1935) of the Historische Reichskommission
- Known for: Historism

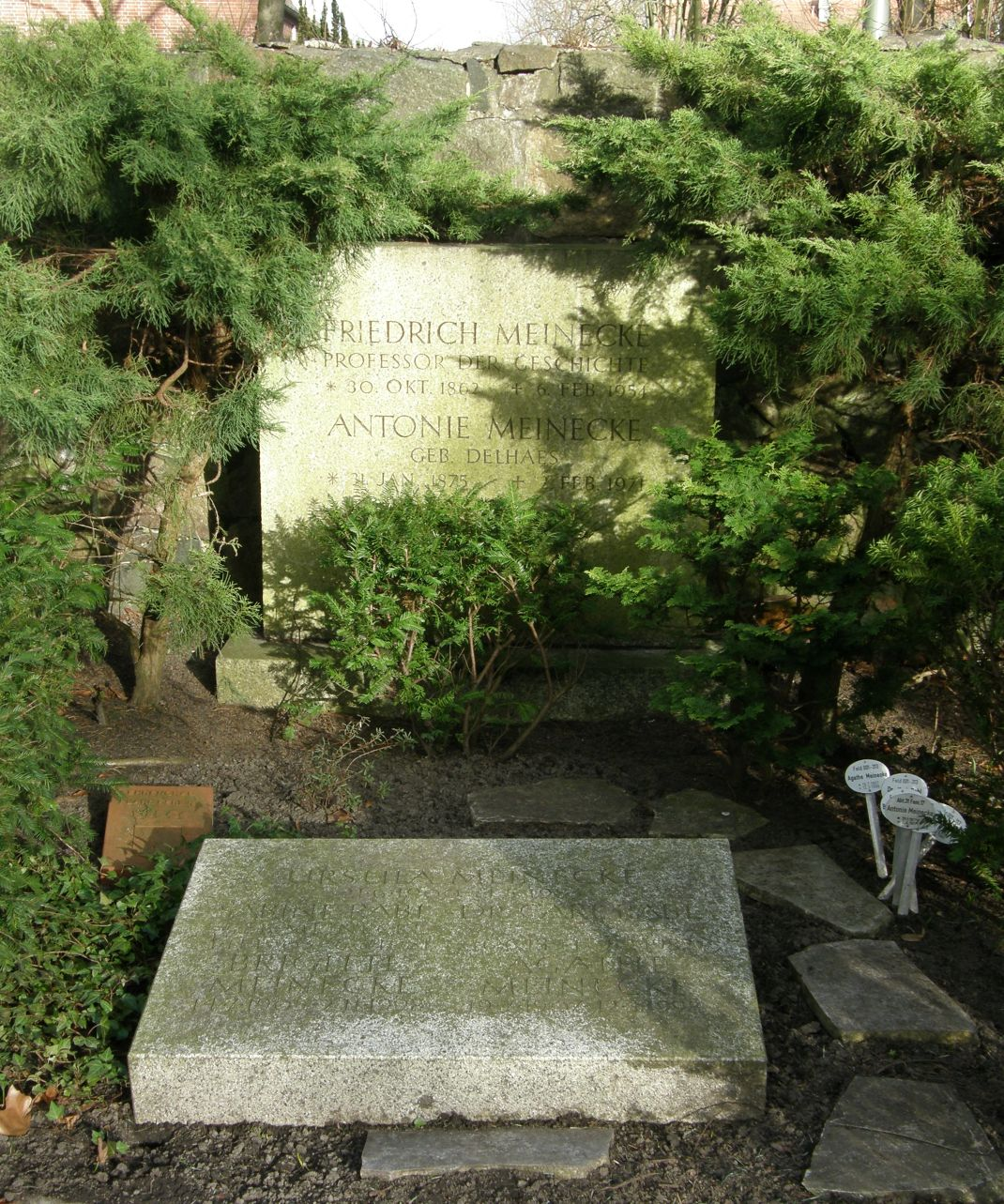
Grave

Friedrich Meinecke (October 20, 1862 – February 6, 1954) was a German historian with national liberal and antisemitic views who supported the Nazi invasion of Poland. As a representative of an older tradition, he criticised the Nazi regime after World War II but continued to express antisemitic prejudices.

In 1948, he helped found the Free University of Berlin in West Berlin, and he remained an important figure to the end of his life.

== Life ==
Meinecke was born in Salzwedel in the Province of Saxony in the Kingdom of Prussia and attended school at the Köllnische Gymnasium in Berlin. He was educated at the University of Bonn and Friedrich Wilhelm University in Berlin. In the period 1887–1901, he worked as an archivist at the German State Archives.

Meinecke was best known for his work on 18th- and 19th-century German intellectual and cultural history. The book that made his reputation was his 1908 work Weltbürgertum und Nationalstaat ('Cosmopolitanism and the National State'), which traced the development of national feelings in the 19th century.

A professor at the University of Strasbourg, he served as editor of the journal Historische Zeitschrift between 1896 and 1935 and chaired the Historische Reichskommission from 1928 to 1935. As a nationalist historian, Meinecke had little regard for the wishes of peoples in Eastern Europe, and he went as far as writing about the "raw bestiality of the south Slavs", while favoring German expansionism into the East.

== First World War ==
During the First World War, he advocated removing Polish landowners from the Prussian provinces of West Prussia and Posen, which had been acquired from Poland during the Partitions of Poland, to Congress Poland. In addition, he proposed the German colonisation of Courland after the expulsion of its Latvian population.

Some authors have likened his views to ethnic cleansing. When the German Empire formulated the so-called Polish Border Strip plan, which called for the annexation of a large swathe of land from Congress Poland and the removal of millions of Poles and Jews to make room for German settlers, Meinecke welcomed the idea with contentment.

== Weimar Years ==
Starting with Die Idee der Staatsräson (1924), much of his work concerns the conflict between Kratos (power) and Ethos (morality) and how to achieve a balance between them.

One of his students was Heinrich Brüning, the future Chancellor. Under the Weimar Republic, Meinecke was a Vernunftsrepublikaner (republican by reason), someone who supported the republic as the least bad alternative. He was one of the founders of the German Democratic Party in 1918.

== During the Third Reich ==
Under the Third Reich, Meinecke had some sympathy for the regime, especially in regard to its early antisemitic laws. After 1935, Meinecke fell into a state of semi-disgrace, and he was removed as editor of the Historische Zeitschrift. Though Meinecke remained in public a supporter of the regime, he privately became increasingly bothered by what he regarded as the violence and crudeness of the Nazis. Nevertheless, he openly described himself as "anti-Semitic", and while he was willing to have Jewish friends and colleagues, the Nazi persecution of Jews never bothered him much.

After the German invasion of Poland in 1939, he praised it in a letter to Siegfred August Kaehler: "You will also have been delighted by this splendid campaign".

== Post-World War II ==
In of Meinecke's best-known books, Die Deutsche Katastrophe ('The German Catastrophe') of 1946, he attempted to reconcile his lifelong belief in authoritarian state power with the events of 1933–45. His explanation for the success of Nazism points to the legacy of Prussian militarism in Germany, the effects of rapid industrialisation and the weaknesses of the middle classes, but Meinecke also asserts that Hitlerism benefited from a series of unfortunate accidents, which had no connection with the earlier developments in German history. Meinecke interpreted Nazism as an "alien force occupying Germany", and he also expressed prejudice against Jews. Meinecke claimed that Jews were responsible for antisemitism and blamed them for the fall of liberalism. The German catastrophe represented two classic themes of antisemitism: resentment based on Jewish economic activities and their alleged "character".

In 1948, Meinecke helped to found the Free University of Berlin.

British historian E. H. Carr cites him as an example of a historian whose views are heavily influenced by the Zeitgeist: liberal during the German Empire, discouraged during the interwar period and deeply pessimistic after World War II.

== Legacy in the United States ==
Friedrich Meinecke was a German historian known for his tolerance of other viewpoints. This was quite remarkable in Germany given the academic environment of his time. The majority of his professional colleagues were intensely opposed to democracy. Many also held antisemitic prejudices. Meinecke himself wasn't entirely free of these biases either.

Despite Meinecke's traditional views, he trained scholars who had views divergent from his, for example, democratic views or those who were Jews or with Jewish connections. Methodologically, these students also diverged. They moved away from the rigid Prussian focus on the state and an emphasis on political ideas. Instead, they increasingly paid attention to the influence of social and economic factors on politics. This was especially apparent among his students who emigrated from Germany with the rise of Nazism. One of Meinecke's students was Hajo Holborn, an active Social Democrat, who was married to a Jew. Holborn was an eminent scholar of modern Germany, who emigrated to the United States and taught for many years at Yale University where he held the prestigious appointment of Sterling Professor of History. Holborn, in turn, led the doctoral dissertations for over 50 students at Yale. Some of Holborn's more well-known students were Henry Cord Meyer, Leonard Krieger, Otto Pflanze, Theodore S. Hamerow, and Arno Mayer. Other Meinecke students who emigrated to the United States were Hans Rosenberg and Fritz Stern. Thus, Meinecke’s scholarship may be said to have crossed the Atlantic, spreading high German academic standards to the study of German history in the United States.

== Works ==
- Das Leben des Generalfeldmarschalls Hermann von Boyen (2 volumes, 1896–1899) (The Life of Field Marshal Hermann von Boyen)
- Das Zeitalter der deutschen Erhebung, 1795–1815 (1906) (The Coming of Age of Germany). Translated into English by Peter Paret as The Age of German Liberation, 1795–1815 (full view on Google Books), based on the 6th German edition, 1957. Berkeley: University of California Press, 1977, ISBN 0-520-03454-6
- Weltbürgertum und Nationalstaat: Studien zur Genesis des deutschen Nationalstaates (1908) (Cosmopolitanism and the Nationstate: Studies in the Beginning of the German Nationstates)
- Radowitz und die deutsche Revolution (1913) (Radowitz and the German Revolution)
- Die Idee der Staatsräson in der neueren Geschichte (1924) (The Idea of Reason of State in Modern History)
- Geschichte des deutsch-englischen Bündnisproblems, 1890–1901 (1927) (The History of German–English Partnership Problems)
- Staat und Persönlichkeit (1933) (State and Personality)
- Die Entstehung des Historismus (2 volumes, 1936) (Historism: The Rise of a New Historical Outlook)
- Die deutsche Katastrophe: Betrachtungen und Erinnerungen (1946) (The German Catastrophe: Contemplations and Recollections)
- 1848: Eine Säkularbetrachtung (1948) (1848: The Year in Review)
- Werke (9 volumes, 1957–1979) (Works)
