= Ludwig Holborn =

- Born: Ludwig Friedrich Christian Holborn; 29 September 1860; Weende, Göttingen, Lower Saxony, Germany
- Died: 19 September 1926 (aged 65)
- Education: University of Göttingen
- Occupation: Physicist
- Known for: Work in the measurement of high temperature using optical pyrometry
- Spouse: Helene Bußmann
- Children: 3, including Louise
- Parent(s): Louis; Louise Oelsen

Ludwig Friedrich Christian Holborn (29 September 1860 – 19 September 1926) was a German physicist known for his work in the measurement of high temperature using optical pyrometry.

Holborn was born in Weende, Göttingen, the son of Louis and Louise née Oelsen. He studied at the Realschule and then went to the University of Göttingen where he studied natural sciences. He then taught mathematics and physics while also serving as an assistant to Ernst Christian Julius Schering at the Göttingen geomagnetic observatory (Gaußschen Erdmagnetischen Observatorium). He received a doctorate in 1887 for studies on the daily variation of magnetic declination. In 1890 he joined the Physikalisch-Technische Reichsanstalt, working there with Hermann von Helmholtz at Charlottenberg and designed a torsion magnetometer in 1903 in collaboration with F.W.G. Kohlrausch. In 1901 he designed what is sometimes called the Holborn-Kurlbaum pyrometer in collaboration with Ferdinand Kurlbaum. This optical pyrometer involved matching colours of an object heated with known reference filament until it becomes invisible. Another pyrometer of the same kind was independently developed and patented by Everett Fleet Morse in the US. He became a head of the thermodynamic lab of the Reichsanstalt in 1914. Holborn also worked on the compressibility of gases at different temperatures but did not work on theoretical aspects.

Holborn married Helene née Bußmann and they had three children including Louise Holborn who became a professor of politics at the Connecticut College for Women and Hajo Holborn who became a historian at Yale University.
