= Albrecht Schöne =

German Germanist (1925–2025)

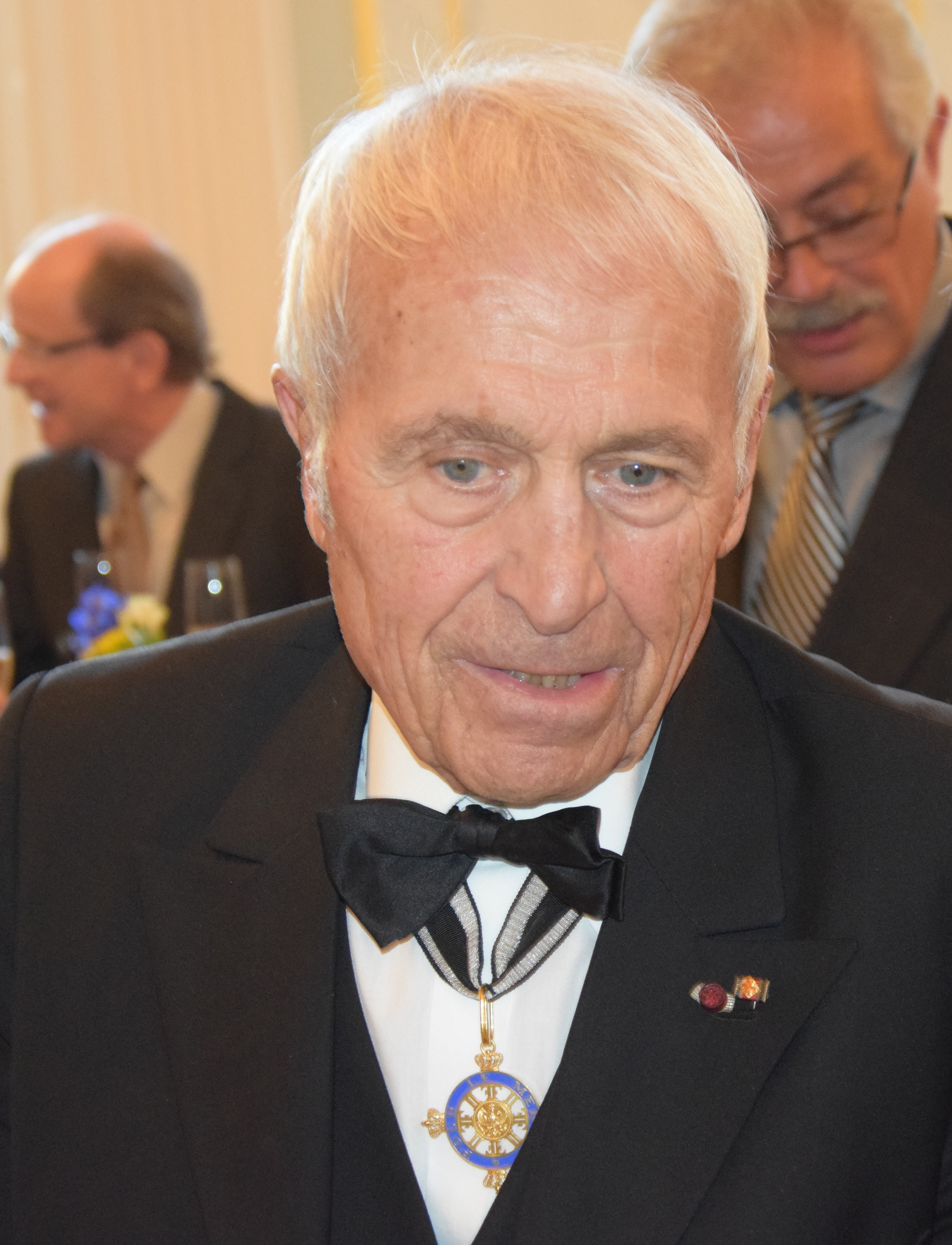
- Schöne in 2014
- Born: 17 July 1925; Barby, Anhalt, Germany
- Died: 21 May 2025 (aged 99)
- Occupation: Germanist
- Awards: Pour le Mérite (1990)

Academic background
- Education: University of Münster
- Thesis: Interpretations of the Poetic Design of Madness in German Literature (1952)

Albrecht Schöne (17 July 1925 – 21 May 2025) was a German Germanist. From 1960 to 1990 he was a professor of German philology at the University of Göttingen.

== Life and career ==
Schöne was born on 17 July 1925 in Barby an der Elbe. He was the firstborn. After graduating from secondary school he immediately performed his military service. During World War II, he was made prisoner of war. Schöne subsequently worked as a lumberjack until 1947. From 1947 to 1951, he studied German literature, history, philosophy, theology and psychiatry at the universities of Freiburg, Basel, Göttingen and Münster. In 1952, Schöne took his Ph.D. from the University of Münster. In 1953, he took a position as research assistant at the Department of German Philology at the University of Göttingen. He performed his habilitation in 1957 with a thesis titled:Säkularisation als sprachbildende Kraft : Studien zur Dichtg dt. Pfarrersöhne. In 1958, he became associate professor of modern German philology at the University of Münster. In 1960, he became full professor of German philology. He was President of the Internationale Vereinigung für Germanische Sprach- und Literaturwissenschaft between 1980 and 1985. He held visiting professorships at universities in Israel, Japan and Poland. Schöne retired in 1990. In 2020, he published his memoirs. Schöne died on 21 May 2025, at the age of 99, about 2 months shy of his 100th birthday.

== Research ==
Schöne's research focused on the Baroque era, the Age of Enlightenment and the 20th-century. In his work he combined philology with theology, art history and the natural sciences. He wrote with new insights on Johann Wolfgang von Goethe and Georg Christoph Lichtenberg.

== Awards and honours ==
Schöne became a member of the Göttingen Academy of Sciences and Humanities in 1966. In 1980, he became a member of the Deutsche Akademie für Sprache und Dichtung. He was elected a corresponding member (living abroad) of the Austrian Academy of Sciences in 1982. The same year he was also appointed corresponding member of the Bavarian Academy of Sciences and Humanities. In 1983, Schöne won the Johann-Heinrich-Merck-Preis of the Deutsche Akademie für Sprache und Dichtung. Schöne was elected a foreign member of the Royal Netherlands Academy of Arts and Sciences in 1985. In 1987, he became a corresponding member of the North Rhine-Westphalian Academy of Sciences, Humanities and the Arts. In 1989, Schöne won the Lower Saxony State Prize.

In 1990, Schöne received the Orden Pour le Mérite für Wissenschaften und Künste. In 1991, he won the Carl Zuckmayer Medal. He became an international honorary member of the American Academy of Arts and Sciences in 1992. On 24 August of the same year, he was awarded the Knight Commander's Cross in the Order of Merit of the Federal Republic of Germany. Schöne was awarded the Austrian Decoration for Science and Art in 1993. In 1995, he was awarded the Reuchlin-Preis of the city of Pforzheim.

In 2015, he received the Ehrenmedaille der Stadt Göttingen. He became an honorary member of the Göttingen Academy of Sciences and Humanities in 2016. Schöne won the 2017 Einhard-Preis.
