= Hans Rosenberg =

German historian (1904–1988)

Hans Rosenberg (February 26, 1904 – June 26, 1988) was a German refugee historian whose works influenced a whole generation of post-war German scholars.

== Life ==
Rosenberg was born in Hanover. His father, Julius, was a merchant of Jewish ancestry, and his mother, Martha, was a Protestant, the daughter of a Prussian civil servant. Hans Rosenberg was baptized as a Protestant, but as an adult he would choose to leave the church and became an atheist. However, the influence of antisemitism would cause him to rediscover his Jewish roots, and he even became, eventually, a left-oriented Zionist.

In 1910, his family moved to Cologne, where he went to school and continued with his academic studies. He transferred to Berlin to study with Friedrich Meinecke, and in 1925 wrote to Meinecke that he considered himself to be a Prussian and Protestant. Under Meinecke's supervision, he wrote his dissertation on Rudolf Haym, the German philosopher, and received his PhD in 1927. Rosenberg returned to Cologne, where he continued to develop his dissertation on Rudolf Haym. He received his Habilitation under the supervision of left-liberal Johannes Zeikursch in 1932, despite strong opposition from conservatives such as Friedrich von der Leyen, Ernst Bertram and Martin Spahn. As the Great Depression unfolded, his attention shifted from the history of ideas and nationalism, which he studied under Meinecke, to economic cycles. The result of this was a 'stunningly original work' on the world economic crisis of 1857–1859, published in Stuttgart in 1934.

Neither Rosenberg nor his wife Helen (a promising concert pianist) seemed likely to secure a good career in Germany, due to a variety of factors including faculty politics at Cologne, as well as the rise of Nazism and his Jewish ancestry. They were forced into exile and he became one of many refugee historians. He endeavored to obtain employment, without success, in England, before finally emigrating to the United States in 1935. He taught briefly at Carlton College in Northfield, Minnesota, and then at Illinois College in Jacksonville, Illinois (1936–1938). He then took a position at Brooklyn College, where he taught undergraduates for twenty years. Among his most distinguished pupils there was Raul Hilberg. His work identified in the power structures and social relations of agrarian society in Prussia the roots of the authoritarian and undemocratic character of what he, with others, took to be the Sonderweg, or special path of modern German history.

In addition to his major appointments, Rosenberg also He taught at the Free University of Berlin (1949–1950) and at Marburg (1955). His influence on the young generation of German historians has led to the claim he was the father of modern social history (Gesellschaftsgeschichte) in post-war Germany. From 1959 to 1972 he taught at the University of California, Berkeley and crowned his career as Shepard Professor Emeritus. To this period is dated his classic work, which he reworked for his classic The Great Depression of 1873-1896 in Central Europe (Grosse Depression und Bismarckzeit, 1967). He retired in 1972, and returned for personal reasons to Germany in 1977, settling in Kirchzarten near the University of Freiburg, where he had been appointed Honorary Professor the year before. He was awarded the Bundesverdienstkreuz, Ist class by the Federal Republic in 1979.

He died in Freiburg im Breisgau in 1988, aged 84.

== Works ==
- Die Weltwirtschaftskrise von 1857–1859, Stuttgart 1934
- Grosse Depression und Bismarckzeit. Wirtschaftsablauf, Gesellschaft und Politik in Mitteleuropa, Berlin 1967
- Bureaucracy, aristocracy, and autocracy: the Prussian experience, 1660–1815, Cambridge Massachusetts, (1958) Beacon Press 2nd.ed.,1966

== Secondary Literature ==
- Georg G. Iggers,'Refugee Historians from Nazi Germany:Political Attitudes towards Democracy,' Monna and Otto Weinmann Lecture Series, 14 September 2005
- Morton Rothstein, "'Drunk on Ideas': Hans Rosenberg as a Teacher at Brooklyn College," Central European History (1991), 24 pp 64–68 Cambridge University Press
- Hanna Schissler, 'Explaining History: Hans Rosenberg' in Lehmann Hartmut and James J. Sheehan (eds.) An Interrupted Past: German-Speaking Refugee Historians in the United States After 1933, Cambridge University Press, 2002 ch.13 pp. 180–187.
- Shulamit Volkov, 'Hans Rosenberg as a teacher: A Few Personal Notes,' 1991 Conference Group for Central European History of the American Historical Association. Pp. 58ff.
