= Einhard-Preis =

Literary prize for historical biography

The Einhard Prize (German: Einhard-Preis) is a literary prize for historical biography. It is awarded by the Einhard-Stiftung, a foundation headquartered in Seligenstadt, Hesse, Germany, a town founded by Einhard, famous as a biographer of Charlemagne. The prize is endowed with €10,000.

== Recipients ==
- 1999: Otto Pflanze, works about Otto von Bismarck
- 2001: Brian Boyd, biography of Vladimir Nabokov
- 2003: Joachim C. Fest, works about Albert Speer
- 2005: Irène Heidelberger-Leonard, Revolte in der Resignation, a biography of Jean Améry
- 2007: Eberhard Weis, biography of Maximilian von Montgelas
- 2009: Margot Friedländer, autobiography Versuche, Dein Leben zu machen
- 2011: Hugh Barr Nisbet, biography of Gotthold Ephraim Lessing
- 2013: John C. G. Röhl, biography of Wilhelm II, German Emperor
- 2015: Joachim Radkau, biography of Theodor Heuss
- 2017: Albrecht Schöne, Der Briefschreiber Goethe
- 2019: Emmanuelle Loyer, biography of Claude Lévi-Strauss
- 2022: Jacques Tardi, graphic novel biography of his father, World War II veteran René Tardi
- 2025: Ulinka Rublack, biography of Albrecht Dürer
