= Albert Salomon (sociologist) =

German-Jewish sociologist

Albert Salomon (8 December 1891, Berlin – 18 December 1966, New York City) was a German-Jewish sociologist.

He was the nephew of Alice Salomon, a proponent of the academic discipline of social work.

== Studies ==
He first studied history of art, history of religions and philosophy at the Humboldt University of Berlin from 1910. He later studied philosophy in Freiburg and Heidelberg, where he came into contact with Max Weber and Georg Lukács, among others. During World War I, he served as a nurse, and in 1921 he took his doctorate in the culture of friendship in Germany in the 19th Century.

In 1926 he started to work at the Deutsche Hochschule für Politik in Berlin. In the same year, he wrote an article on Max Weber in «Die Gesellschaft. Internationale Revue für Sozialismus und Politik», a publication that he later became editor of. Here, he introduced young writers such as Hannah Arendt, Walter Benjamin and Herbert Marcuse. In 1931 he contracted polio, and in 1933 he lost his job due to his Jewish background, and he emigrated with his family to the United States in 1935. He stayed there until his death in 1966 as researcher and teacher at The New School for Social Research.

== Bibliography ==
- Salomon, Albert, 1921: Der Freundschaftskult im 18. Jahrhundert in Deutschland. Versuch zur Soziologie einer Lebensform. Universität Heidelberg, Dissertation (Microfiche). Nytt opptrykk i: Zeitschrift für Soziologie, 1979, S. 279–308.
- Salomon, Albert, 1955: The Tyranny of Progress. Reflections on the Origins of Sociology. New York: Noonday Press. In deutscher Übersetzung von M. Rainer Lepsius: Fortschritt als Schicksal und Verhängnis. Betrachtungen zum Ursprung der Soziologie. Stuttgart: Enke 1957
- Salomon, Albert, 1963: In Praise of Enlightenment. Cleveland: Meridian Press.

== Sources ==
- Grathoff, Richard, 1995: Portrait: Albert Salomon 1891–1966, S. 235–242 i: International Sociology, 10
- Gostmann, Peter; Ikas, Karin und Wagner, Gerhard, 2005: Emigration, Dauerreflexion und Identität. Albert Salomons Beitrag zur Geschichte der Soziologie, S. 267–284 i: Soziologie. Forum der Deutschen Gesellschaft für Soziologie, Jg. 34, Heft 3.
- Matthiesen, Ulf, 1988: „Im Schatten einer endlosen Zeit.“ Etappen der intellektuellen Biographie Albert Salomons, S. 299–350 i: Srubar, Ilja (Hg.) Exil Wissenschaft Identität: Die Emigration deutscher Sozialwissenschaftler 1933–1945 Frankfurt am Main: Suhrkamp
- Mayer, Carl, 1967: In Memoriam: Albert Salomon 1891–1966, S. 213–225 i: Social Research, 34, 2
- Vaitkus, Steven, 1995: Albert Salomon's Sociology of Culture, S. 127–138: International Sociology, 10
