= Ulinka Rublack =

German historian (born 1967)

Ulinka Rublack FBA FRHistS
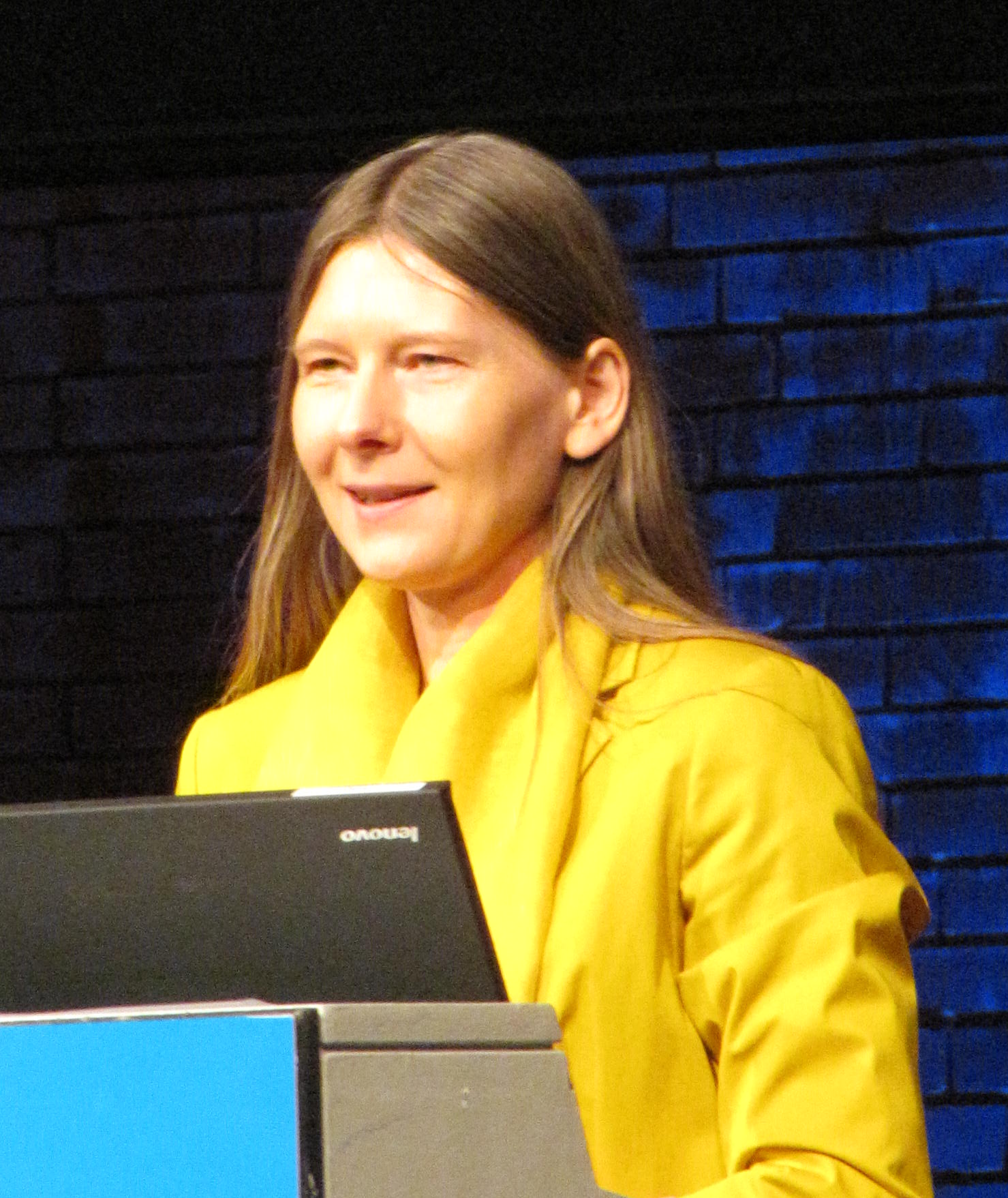
- Rublack in 2013
- Born: 1967 (age 58–59); Tübingen, Baden-Württemberg, Germany

Academic background
- Education: University of Hamburg; University of Cambridge
- Doctoral advisor: Robert W. Scribner

Academic work
- Discipline: History
- Sub-discipline: Cultural history; Reformation; Holy Roman Empire; early modern German history
- Institutions: St John's College, Cambridge

Ulinka Rublack (born 1967) is a German historian. She received her PhD from the University of Cambridge, and is a professor in Early Modern European History and a Fellow of St John's College, Cambridge. Rublack is the founder of the Cambridge History for Schools outreach programme and a co-founder of the Cambridge Centre for Gender Studies. Rublack's father, Hans-Christoph Rublack, was also a historian.

Rublack has been on the expert panel for BBC Radio 4's In Our Time in December 2016 for Kepler; in December 2018 for Thirty Years' War; and in November 2020 for Albrecht Dürer.

== Honours ==
Her book Dressing Up: Cultural Identity in Early Modern Europe was winner of the Bainton Book Prize in 2011.

In July 2017, Rublack was elected a Fellow of the British Academy (FBA), the United Kingdom's national academy for the humanities and social sciences.

She won the 2025 Einhard-Preis for her biography of Albrecht Dürer.

== Selected publications ==
- Rublack, Ulinka (1999), The Crimes of Women in Early Modern Germany, Oxford Studies in Social History, Oxford University Press, ISBN 978-0-19-820637-8
- Rublack, Ulinka (2002), Gender in Early Modern German History, Past and Present Publications, Cambridge University Press, ISBN 978-0-521-81398-3
- Rublack, Ulinka (2011), Dressing Up: Cultural Identity in Renaissance Europe, Oxford University Press, ISBN 978-0-19-929874-7
- Rublack, Ulinka (2015), The Astronomer and the Witch: Johannes Kepler's Fight for his Mother, Oxford University Press, ISBN 978-0-19-873677-6
- Rublack, Ulinka (2016), The Oxford Handbook of the Protestant Reformations, Oxford Handbooks in History, Oxford University Press, ISBN 978-0-19-964692-0
- Rublack, Ulinka (2023), Dürer's Lost Masterpiece: Art and Society at the Dawn of a Global World, Oxford University Press, ISBN 978-0-19-887310-5
