= Köllnisches Gymnasium =

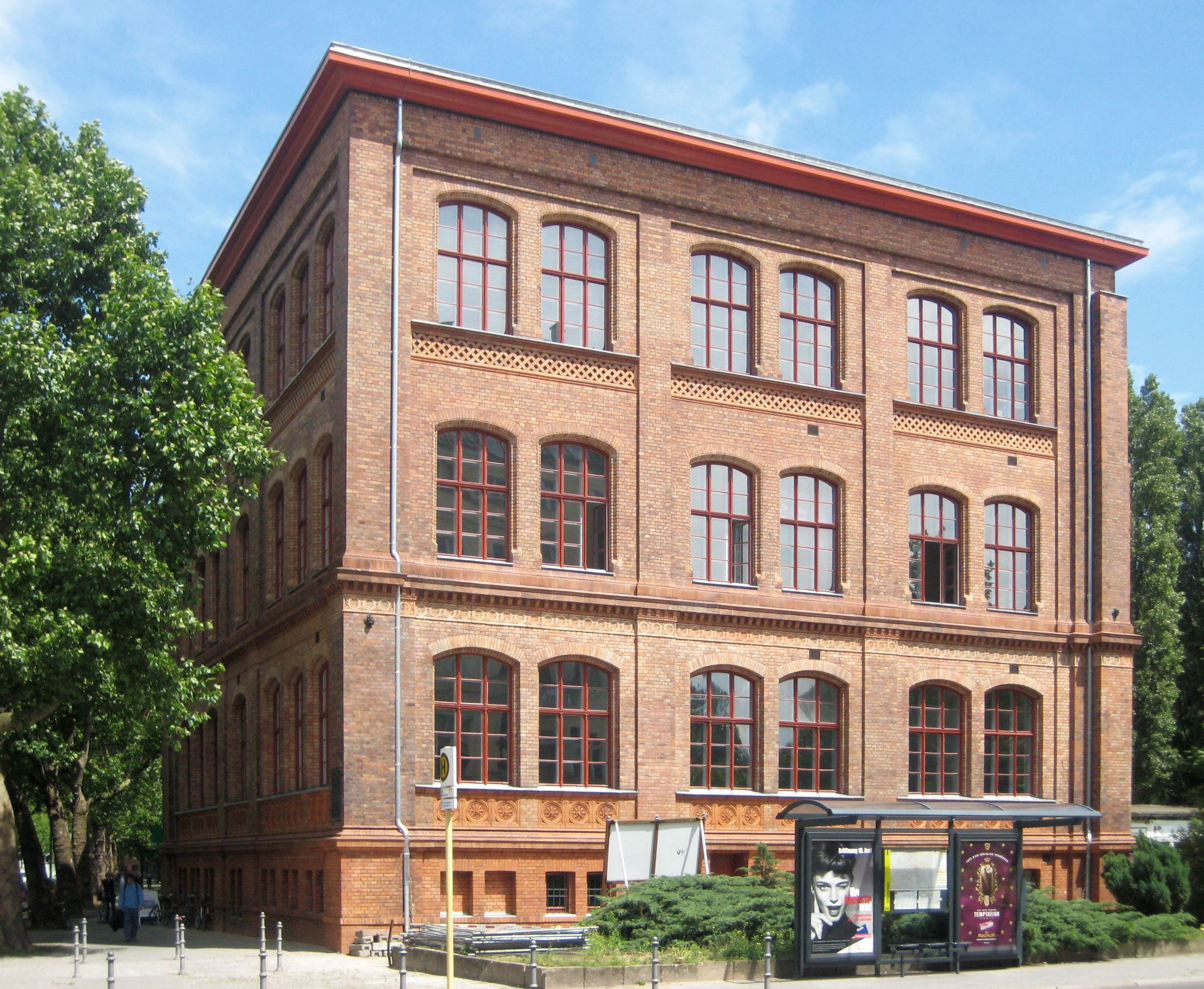
- School building of the Musikschule Mitte, formerly the Köllnisches Gymnasium

Location
- Wallstraße 42; Berlin, 10179; Germany
- Coordinates: 52°30′46″N 13°24′44″E

Information
- School type: Gymnasium
- Established: 1868
- Alumni: Alfred Wegener, Paul Isaac Bernays, Friedrich Meinecke, Horst Wessel

The Köllnische Gymnasium was the first Berlin Realgymnasium. The school building was constructed in 1868 at the corner of Insel-/Wallstraße in the Berlin suburb of Neu-Kölln according to plans by the city building councilor Adolf Gerstenberg. Today, the Fanny Hensel Music School is located in the heritage-protected building complex.

As early as the 14th century, there was a Köllnische Latin School on the western bank of the Spree. In 1540, Heinrich Knaust, a student of Martin Luther and Philipp Melanchthon, took over the leadership of this school. After the Seven Years' War, in 1766, the upper level of the Berlin Gymnasium zum Grauen Kloster was merged with the Köllnische Gymnasium. The educational institution was now called the Berlin-Köllnische Gymnasium zum Grauen Kloster.

However, in 1824, the separation occurred again. The students of the Köllnische School used the premises of the Kölln Town Hall. Due to increasing numbers of students in the 1860s, the municipal administration commissioned a new school building, providing the plot at Inselstraße 2–5 for this purpose. Between 1865 and 1868, the schoolhouse of the new Köllnische Gymnasium was built according to plans by Adolf Gerstenberg, who at the same time also constructed the school complex of the Sophien Gymnasium on Weinmeisterstraße.

The school's modern language profile was expanded to include a classical education, and special sports such as fencing were taught. Once considered an elite institution, by the 1920s it had become accessible to the lower classes. After the Nazis came to power, the educational institution was renamed Altköllnische Schule. The school was relocated to the Protectorate of Bohemia and Moravia in 1943. Students who could not or did not want to move attended schools in the Berlin suburbs.

== Building ==
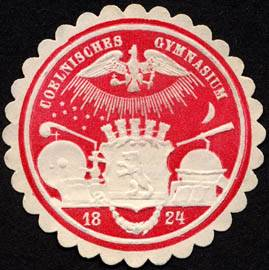
A Prussian eagle, Berlin bear and the year of its refoundation

The new building was officially opened in November 1868. For this occasion, Paul Schnöpf and Ernst Ferdinand August (school director 1827–1868) composed their own music. Berlin's mayor at the time, Heinrich Philipp Hedemann, also attended the event. Gerstenberg had designed a three-story clinker brick building adorned with a central projection and various terracotta ornaments. A residence for the teachers of the educational institution, designed in the same style and with the same materials but only two stories high, was attached on the side facing Köllnische Park.

The school was severely damaged in the bombing of Berlin World War II. Two-thirds of the school building and the gymnasium were destroyed. The gymnasium was not continued. In the 1950s, the remaining parts of the building were simply repaired and used as a special school. After the reunification of Germany, the district administration carried out extensive renovation work, and the Fanny Hensel Music School subsequently moved into the school building.

The building with the attached teacher's residence is under heritage protection (Denkmalschutz).

Various brick stamps visible on the facade still indicate the origin and manual production of the bricks used.

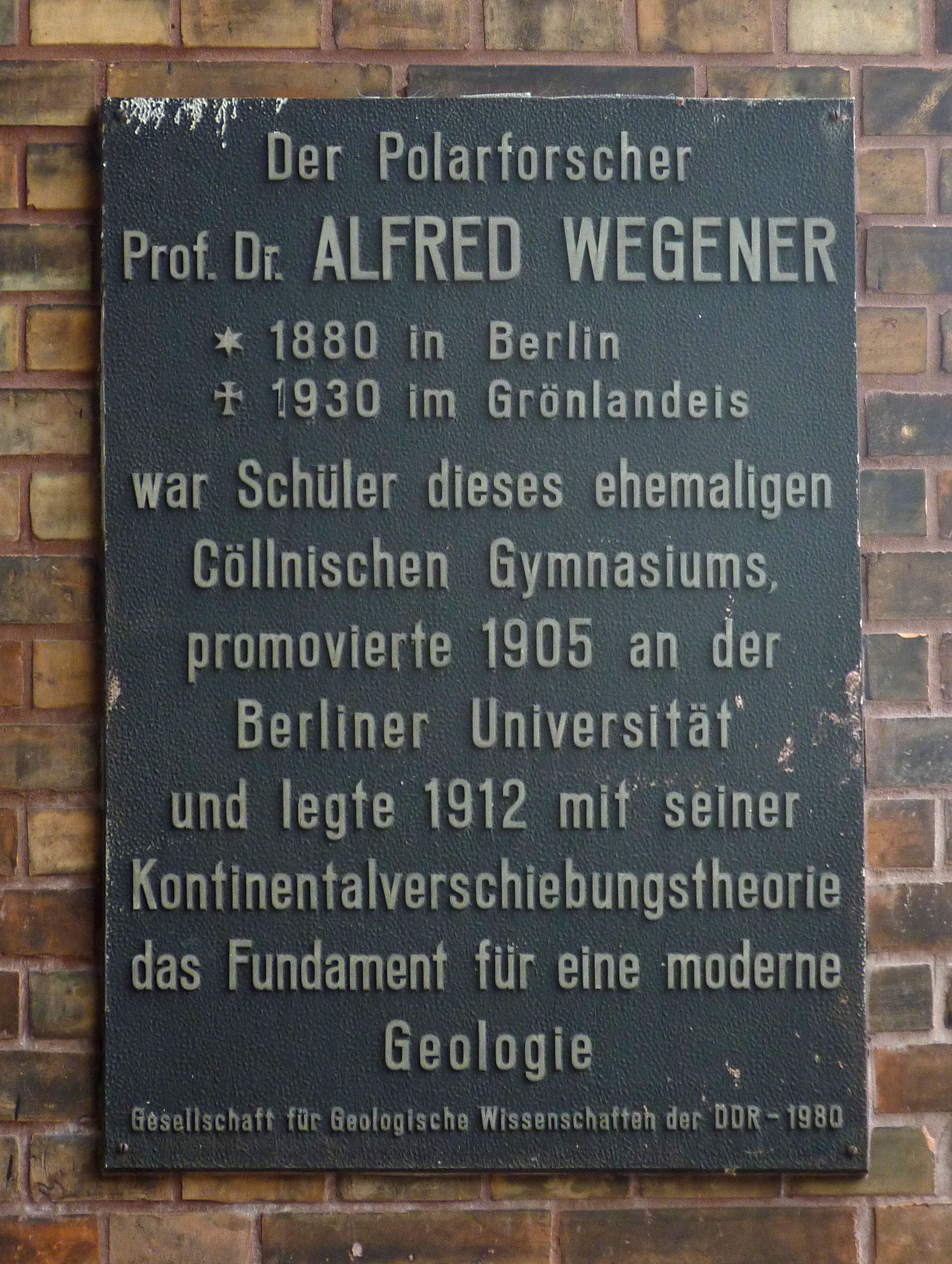
Memorial plaque for Alfred Wegener
