= Ferdinand Kurlbaum =

German physicist

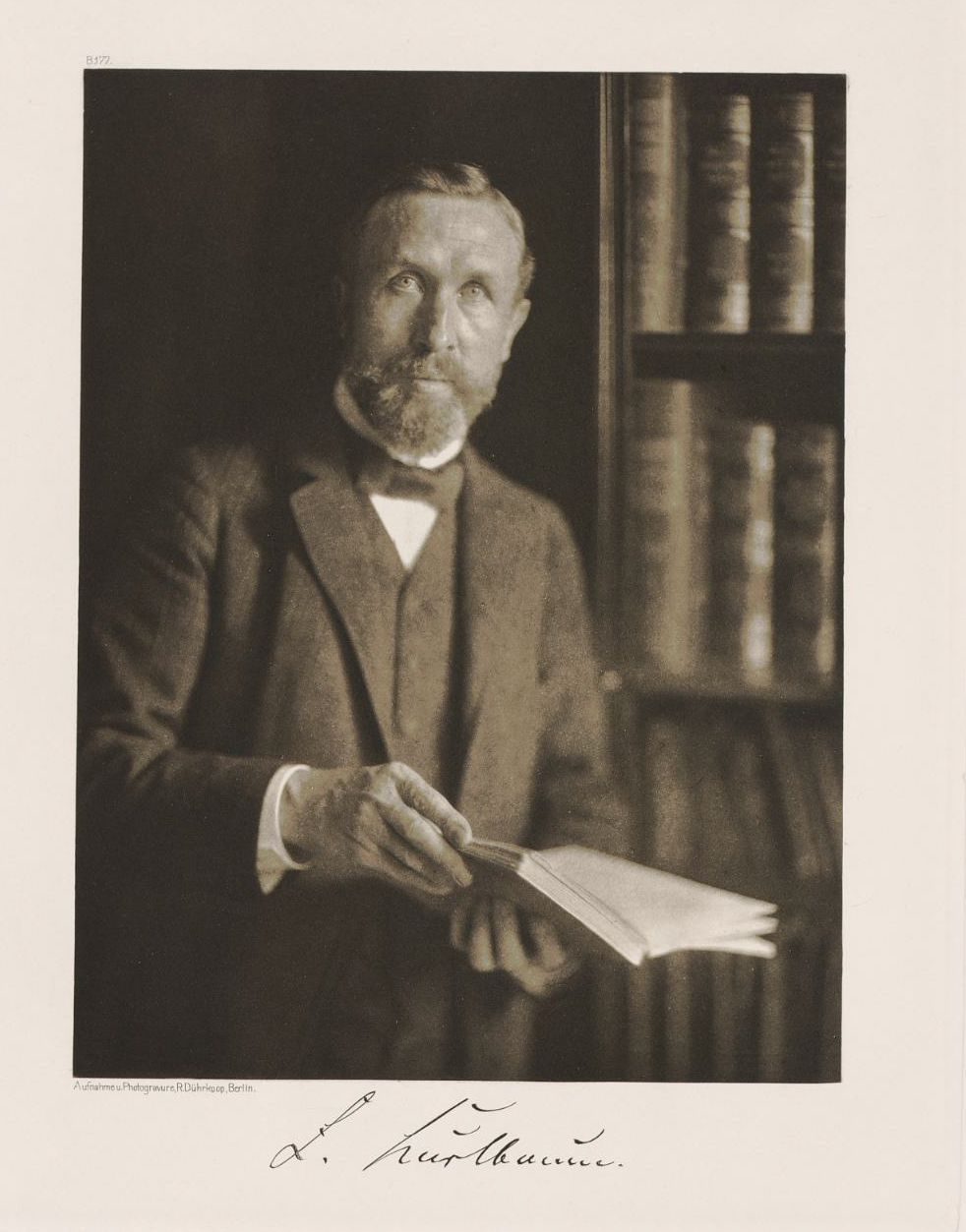
Ferdinand Kurbaum, 1907, photo by Rudolf Dührkoop

Ferdinand Kurlbaum (4 October 1857 in Burg bei Magdeburg – 29 July 1927 in Berlin) was a German physicist.

== Life and work ==
As the son of a magistrate, he had to follow his frequently transferred father. Problems at school were the result, and it wasn't until he was 23 that he graduated from high school. He studied mathematics and physics in Heidelberg and Berlin with Hermann Helmholtz. In 1887, he completed his dissertation on 'Determining the wavelength of Fraunhofer lines'.

This was followed by an assistantship in Hanover with Heinrich Kayser. From 1891 he worked in the Optischen Laboratorium (optical laboratory) of the Physikalisch-Technische Reichsanstalt in Berlin. The physics of light and heat radiation was his subject. Together with Heinrich Rubens, he carried out series of measurements on the radiation intensity of black bodies. These were important foundations for Planck's law of radiation and thus for quantum physics. He also studied the use of X-rays in medicine.

In 1904, Kurlbaum received an appointment to the Technische Hochschule at Charlottenburg. In 1908, together with Adolf Miethe, he carried out measurements of the sun's temperature in Upper Egypt. From 1908 to 1925 he was head of the Physics Institute at the Technische Hochschule at Charlottenburg.

Kurlbaum was President of the German Physical Society from 1910 to 1912 . During World War I, he was a consultant to the Artillery Examination Commission.

Kurlbaum married Elisabeth von Siemens in 1895. They had two daughters and a son. The Georg Kurlbaum Prize for innovative economic achievements is named after his son Georg.

Ferdinand Kurlbaum was buried in the Siemens family crypt in the park of Schloss Ahlsdorf near Herzberg.

== See also ==
- Disappearing-filament pyrometer
- Planck law
- Platinum black
- Kurlbaum

Related people

- Ludwig Holborn
- Adolf Miethe
- Heinrich Rubens
