= Deutsche Hochschule für Politik =

The Deutsche Hochschule für Politik (DHfP), or German Academy for Politics, was a private academy in Berlin, founded in October 1920. It was integrated into the Faculty for Foreign Studies (Auslandswissenschaftliche Fakultät) of the Friedrich-Wilhelms-Universität in 1940, was re-founded in 1948 and turned into the Otto-Suhr-Institut of the Freie Universität Berlin in 1959.

== Purpose ==
The DHfP was to establish the elementary principles of a democratic community in Germany in a liberal spirit and thus help to strengthen the young Weimar Republic against anti-democratic tendencies. Political science was at this time still understood as the study of democracy. The predecessor institution of the Deutsche Hochschule für Politik was the "Staatsbürgerschule" (Citizens' Academy) in Berlin, founded in 1918.

Sponsors or members of the founding board of trustees were amongst others Walter Simons, Ernst Jäckh, Friedrich Naumann, Friedrich Meinecke, Max Weber, Hugo Preuß, Gertrud Bäumer and Otto Heinrich von der Gablentz. The Prussian education reformer (and scholar of Islamic studies) Carl Heinrich Becker played an important role in the successful founding of the new academy.

== Weimar Republic ==
Lectures and seminars for the first 120 students at first took place only in the evening, mostly with volunteer lecturers. The core areas of teaching were at first:

1. General Politics, Political History and Political Sociology
2. Foreign Policy and Foreign Studies
3. Domestic Politics, including cultural policy and the media
4. Legal Foundations of Politics
5. Economic Foundations of Politics

With rising numbers of students, in the following years the proportion of paid teaching staff rose, as did the number of professorships. A degree could not be awarded by the Hochschule für Politik until the mid-1920s, due to the difficulties in making the education sufficiently academic.

The teaching staff included, amongst others, the women's rights activist Gertrud Bäumer, Carl Heinrich Becker, Rudolf Breitscheid, the constitutional lawyer Hermann Heller, the later Bundespräsident Theodor Heuss, Rudolf Hilferding, Wilhelm Heile, Hermann Luther, the politician and sociology professor Ernst Niekisch, the German-Jewish sociologist Albert Salomon, the Swiss political scientist Arnold Wolfers, the historian Hans Delbrück, Hajo Holborn, Eckart Kehr, Veit Valentin, Ernst Jäckh, the jurists Hermann Pünder, and Arnold Brecht, the economist Hans Staudinger and the government ministers Walther Rathenau, Bill Drews and Walter Simons. The latter's son Hans Simons (de) was the head of the academy and also had teaching duties.

Jäckh was initially head of the Hochschule. Then Wolfers became the director of the Hochschule from 1930 until 1933, with Jäckh as president and chair.

== Third Reich ==
Jäckh, like other German academics, witnessed first-hand the demise of the Weimar Republic and the rise to power of the Nazi Party. While some of the academics perceived immediately the reality of the Nazis, Jäckh and Wolfers did not. Wolfers had a belief in the great man theory, extended to the role of great nations, and was drawn to the notion of spectacular actions in international relations; as such he found some Nazi rhetoric appealing. In this manner Wolfers tended to be in agreement with some of the foreign policy objectives of the Nazi regime, especially in the East, thinking that those objectives could play a part in restoring the European balance of power. Long an advocate of a "New Germany", and with an internationalist perspective in which he saw himself as an unofficial ambassador for his country in international dealings, Jäckh continued this approach even after Hitler seized power with the Machtergreifung in January 1933. Indeed, in public statements and a private letter to Hitler, Jäckh maintained that a continuity was possible between the liberalism of Naumann and the national socialism of the new regime. His attempts at accommodation with the Nazis were to little avail, however, as the Hochschule underwent a political purge, lost its independence, and was put under control of the Reich Ministry of Public Enlightenment and Propaganda later during 1933.

Many of the teaching staff of the academy emigrated during that year, in order to escape the Nazi repression of political opponents and those of Jewish descent. Jäckh and Wolfers were also among those who left the country. The political writer Peter Kleist then became the director.

Under the Nazi regime, the academy at first became directly subordinated to the government in 1937. The lecturers closest to National Socialism were the "nationalist-revisionist" and the "völkisch-conservative" ones, who came from the Politische Kolleg. The latter had formed a working group with the academy in 1927. From this point on the teaching staff were divided, and no unified concept was agreed upon. Political science was then restricted to foreign policy and "foreign studies", and thus became part of the Nazi ideological apparatus and foreign policy.

In 1940 the Deutsche Hochschule für Politik was merged with the Institute for Oriental Languages, which had become the foreign studies school of the Universität Berlin in 1935. They were now integrated into the university as the Faculty of Foreign Studies ("Auslandswissenschaftliche Fakultät"). The dean was Franz Alfred Six, 30 years old. Six was an SS intellectual, who belonged to the elite of the NSDAP; he worked simultaneously on the extermination of the Jews as Adolf Eichmann's superior in the Reichssicherheitshauptamt. Another leading National Socialist at the Hochschule für Politik was the sociologist and geopolitics scholar Karl Heinz Pfeffer, who succeeded Six as dean. Anti-colonialist students (mostly Indian and Arab) also studied there until 1945.

Some teachers in the Faculty of Foreign Studies were Albrecht Haushofer, Harro Schulze-Boysen and Mildred Harnack. Some of the students were: Eva-Maria Buch, Ursula Goetze, Horst Heilmann and Rainer Hildebrandt.

The number of Nazi Party members as a proportion of this Faculty was 65%, twice as much as other Berlin higher education institutions (Humboldt University of Berlin: 38%, Philosophy Faculty: 31%). It cooperated extensively with the government-run Deutsches Auslandswissenschaftliches Institut (DAWI; German Institute for Foreign Studies) of the Reich Ministry of Public Enlightenment. This institute was also run by Six, who also had a third function as head of the "Kulturpolitische Abteilung" of the German Foreign Office.

== Post-war period ==
In 1948 the Deutsche Hochschule für Politik was re-founded by the Social Democrat Otto Suhr. It was integrated into the Freie Universität Berlin and moved to Berlin-Dahlem, as the newly founded Otto-Suhr-Institut in 1959. Its previous representative building in Schöneberg was used by the Fachhochschule für Wirtschaft Berlin from 1971.

== Legacy ==
The legacy of the Deutsche Hochschule für Politik during the Nazi period is mixed. The progressive, democratic reputation that the Hochschule had enjoyed for decades became diminished as a result of scholarly research performed in the latter part of the twentieth century, which showed that the Hochschule's relationship with the Nazi Party was not the one of pure opposition that had been portrayed. With those findings, the reputation of some of the Hochschule's leaders suffered somewhat as well.

Nonetheless, an exhibition, about the staff and students of the Deutsche Hochschule für Politik who were active in resistance groups during the time of the Nazi dictatorship, was opened on 14 June 2008 in the foyer of the Otto-Suhr-Institut by Wolfgang Thierse, the Vice President of the Bundestag. Since then, the exhibition, done by Siegfried Mielke and his colleagues, has also been shown at other venues. The exhibition and accompanying materials give an overview of the development of the Hochschule. It is centred on several dozen biographies of students and members of staff, who fought against National Socialism in different groups either in the resistance or in exile. The biographies show a connection between the democratic orientation of the Hochschule and the political work of many of its teachers and students against the Nazi state. Although already at the start of 1933 staff and students at the German universities were starting to support the Nazis in droves, at the DHfP the majority of faculty and students stayed true to the democratic ideals it was founded on. According to the authors of these biographies, this was "unique" in the academic landscape. Just as unequalled was the large number of staff and students who joined resistance groups or fought the Nazi system in exile.

== Sources ==
- Eisfeld, Rainer (2014). "From the Berlin Political Studies Institute to Columbia and Yale: Ernest Jaeckh and Arnold Wolfers". In Rösch, Felix (ed.). Émigré Scholars and the Genesis of International Relations: A European Discipline in America?. Basingstoke, Hampshire: Palgrave Macmillan. pp. 113–131.
- Korenblat, Steven D. (September 2006). "A School for the Republic? Cosmopolitans and Their Enemies at the Deutsche Hochschule Für Politik, 1920–1933". Central European History. 39 (3): 394–430. doi:10.1017/S0008938906000148. S2CID 144221659.
- Stuart, Douglas T. (1994). "Discord and Collaboration: Enduring Insights of Arnold Wolfers". In Stuart, Douglas T.; Szabo, Stephen F. (eds.). Discord and Collaboration in a New Europe: Essays in Honor of Arnold Wolfers. Washington, D.C.: Foreign Policy Institute, Paul H. Nitze School of Advanced International Studies, Johns Hopkins University. pp. 3–10.
- Weber, Peter (2019). "Ernst Jäckh and the National Internationalism of Interwar Germany". Central European History. 52 (3): 402–423. doi:10.1017/S0008938919000761. ISSN 0008-9389. S2CID 204373771.
