= Hajo Holborn =

American historian

Hajo Holborn (German: [ˈhaːjo hɔlˈbɔʁn]; 18 May 1902, Berlin – 20 June 1969, Bonn) was a German-American historian and specialist in modern German history. He was designated a Sterling Professor of History at Yale University in 1959, the highest academic rank offered by the university.

== Early life ==
Hajo Holborn was born in 1902. His father was Ludwig Holborn, a German physicist and "Direktor der Physikalisch-Technischen Reichsanstalt." He studied German history with Friedrich Meinecke at Berlin University, as well as with other eminent historians such as Karl Holl, Adolf von Harnack and Ernst Troeltsch. He earned a Ph.D. in 1924 at the age of 22. After becoming a lecturer of medieval and modern history at Heidelberg in 1926, he was promoted to Privatdozent. His next professional advancement was to Carnegie Professor of History and International Relationships at the private Deutsche Hochschule für Politik in Berlin. He was dismissed from his appointment in 1933 by the Nazi government, but he had already left the country by that time.

== Emigration ==
Unwilling to support National Socialism, he fled to the United Kingdom. From there, he emigrated to the United States in 1934. Shortly after coming to America, he was appointed visiting professor of German history at Yale University.

He taught Diplomatic History at Tufts University, Massachusetts, (1936–1942) and was a guest professor at the University of Vienna, Austria (1955). He became a U.S. citizen and during the Second World War he worked for the Office of Strategic Services as special assistant to the chief of its Research and Analysis Branch, William L. Langer.

== Postwar ==
After the war, he served as Randolph W. Townsend Professor at Yale until 1959, when he was awarded the title of Sterling Professor of History at Yale University; here he continued to teach and write until his death in 1969.

In 1967, Holborn became the second president of the American Historical Association not born in the United States (after Michael Rostovtzeff). Several well-known scholars of German and European history in America, including Peter Gay, Theodore Hamerow, Leonard Krieger and Otto Pflanze, were students of Holborn.

== Family ==
Hajo Holborn married Annemarie Bettmann. Their son, Fred Holborn (born 1928), was a senior adjunct professor of American Foreign Policy at the School of Advanced International Studies at Johns Hopkins University before his death in 2005.

Their daughter, Hanna Holborn Gray (born 1930), is a historian of political thought in the Renaissance and Reformation. She is the Harry Pratt Judson Professor Emeritus at the University of Chicago and was the university's president for 15 years.

== Work ==
Prior to his emigration, Holborn was commissioned by the government to compose a history of the constitution of the Weimar Republic, resulting in the work The Weimar Republic and the Birth of the German Democratic Party: The Hajo Holborn Papers, 1849–1956.

Other works by Holborn include the History of Modern Germany series, spanning three volumes and covering a four-century period from the Reformation and culminating in the capitulation of Hitler's regime in 1945. Holborn's work has been praised by peers, including Fritz Stern.
