= Pyrometer =

Type of thermometer sensing radiation

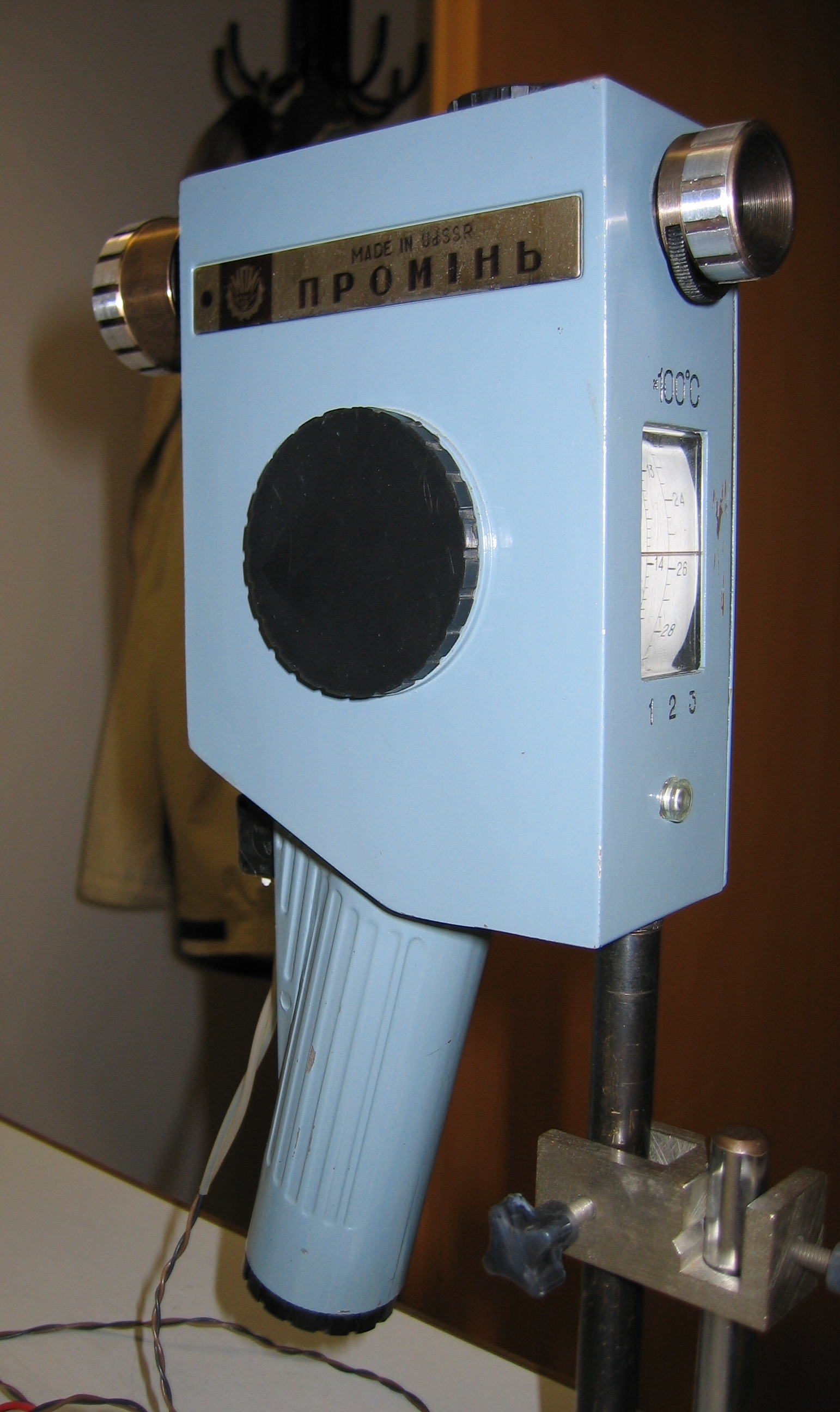
An optical pyrometer

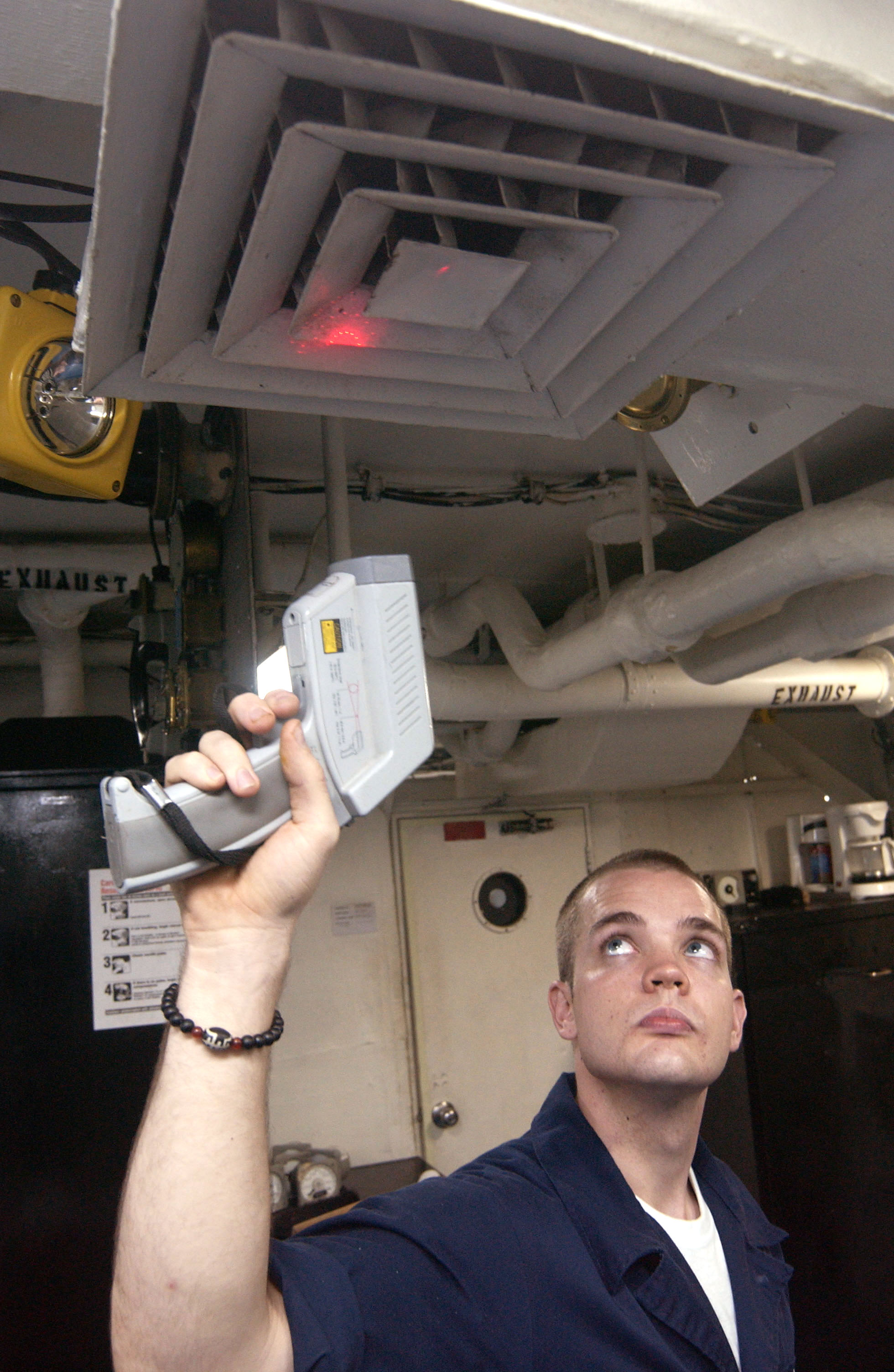
A sailor checking the temperature of a ventilation system

A pyrometer, or radiation thermometer, is a type of remote sensing thermometer used to measure the temperature of distant objects. Various forms of pyrometers have historically existed. In the modern usage, it is a device that from a distance determines the temperature of a surface from the amount of the thermal radiation it emits. The process is known as pyrometry, a type of radiometry.

The word pyrometer comes from the Greek word for fire, "πῦρ" (pyr), and meter, meaning to measure. The word pyrometer was originally coined to denote a device capable of measuring the temperature of an object by its incandescence, visible light emitted by a body which is at least red-hot. Infrared thermometers, can also measure the temperature of cooler objects, down to room temperature, by detecting their infrared radiation flux. Modern pyrometers are available for a wide range of wavelengths and are generally called radiation thermometers.

== Principle ==
A pyrometer is based on the principle that the intensity of light received by the observer depends upon the distance of the observer from the source and the temperature of the distant source. A modern pyrometer has an optical system and a detector. The optical system focuses the thermal radiation onto the detector. The output signal of the detector (temperature T) is related to the thermal radiation or irradiance $j^\star$ of the target object through the Stefan–Boltzmann law, the constant of proportionality σ, called the Stefan–Boltzmann constant and the emissivity ε of the object:

$$j^\star = \varepsilon \sigma T^4.$$

This output is used to infer the object's temperature from a distance, with no need for the pyrometer to be in thermal contact with the object; most other thermometers (e.g. thermocouples and resistance temperature detectors (RTDs)) are placed in thermal contact with the object and allowed to reach thermal equilibrium.

Pyrometry of gases presents difficulties. These are most commonly overcome by using thin-filament pyrometry or soot pyrometry. Both techniques involve small solids in contact with hot gases.

== History ==
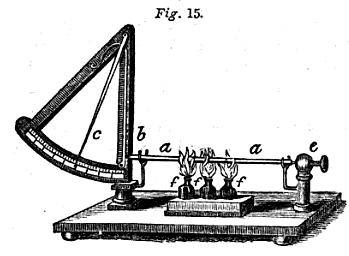
A pyrometer from 1852. Heating the metal bar (a) presses against a lever (b), which moves a pointer (c) along a scale that serves as a measuring index. (e) is an immovable prop which holds the bar in place. A spring on (c) pushes against (b), causing the index to fall back once the bar cools.

The term pyrometer was coined in the 1730s by Pieter van Musschenbroek, better known as the inventor of the Leyden jar. His device, of which no surviving specimens are known, may be now called a dilatometer because it measured the dilation of a metal rod.

The earliest example of a pyrometer thought to be in existence is the Hindley Pyrometer held by the London Science Museum, dating from 1752, produced for the Royal collection. The pyrometer was a well known enough instrument that it was described in some detail by the mathematician Euler in 1760.

Around 1782 potter Josiah Wedgwood invented a different type of pyrometer (or rather a pyrometric device) to measure the temperature in his kilns, which first compared the color of clay fired at known temperatures, but was eventually upgraded to measuring the shrinkage of pieces of clay, which depended on kiln temperature (see Wedgwood scale for details). Later examples used the expansion of a metal bar.

In the 1860s–1870s brothers William and Werner Siemens developed a platinum resistance thermometer, initially to measure temperature in undersea cables, but then adapted for measuring temperatures in metallurgy up to 1000 °C, hence deserving a name of pyrometer.

Around 1890 Henry Louis Le Chatelier developed the thermoelectric pyrometer.

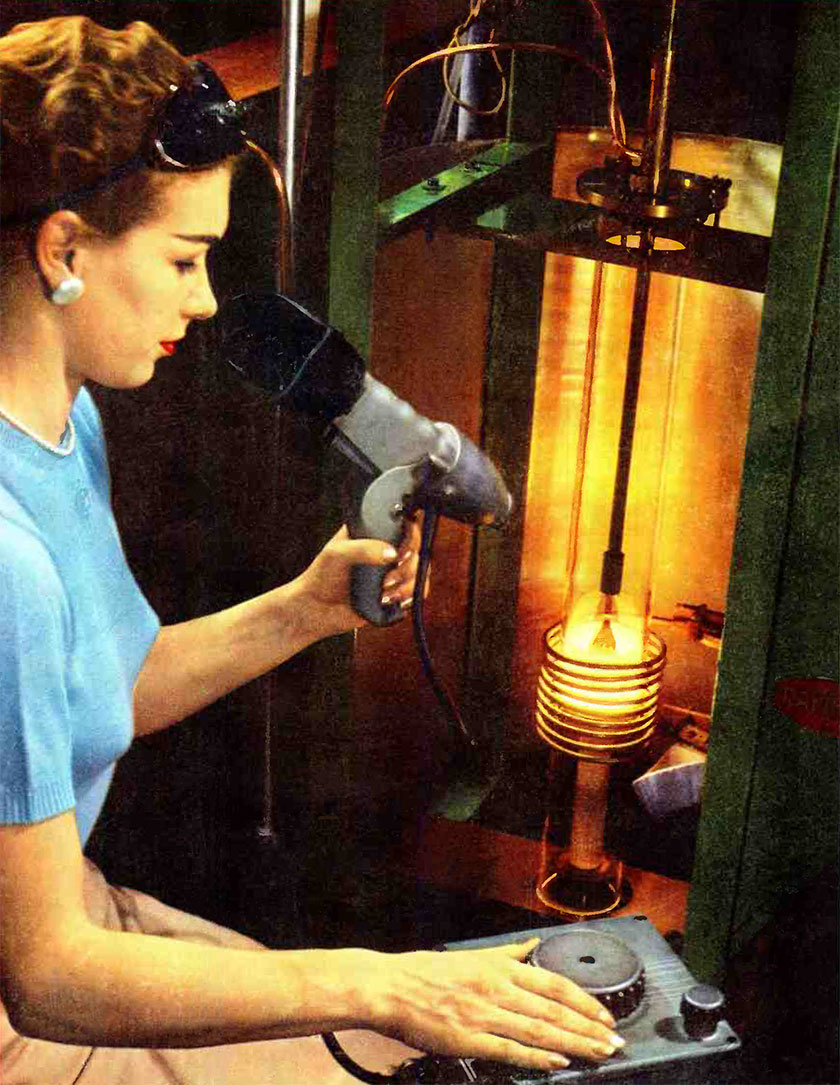
Technician measuring the temperature of molten silicon at 2,650 °F (1,450 °C) with a disappearing-filament pyrometer in Czochralski crystal growing equipment at Raytheon transistor plant in 1956

The first disappearing-filament pyrometer was built by L. Holborn and F. Kurlbaum in 1901. This device had a thin electrical filament between an observer's eye and an incandescent object. The current through the filament was adjusted until it was of the same colour (and hence temperature) as the object, and no longer visible; it was calibrated to allow temperature to be inferred from the current.

The temperature returned by the vanishing-filament pyrometer and others of its kind, called brightness pyrometers, is dependent on the emissivity of the object. With greater use of brightness pyrometers, it became obvious that problems existed with relying on knowledge of the value of emissivity. Emissivity was found to change, often drastically, with surface roughness, bulk and surface composition, and even the temperature itself.

To get around these difficulties, the ratio or two-color pyrometer was developed. They rely on the fact that Planck's law, which relates temperature to the intensity of radiation emitted at individual wavelengths, can be solved for temperature if Planck's statement of the intensities at two different wavelengths is divided. This solution assumes that the emissivity is the same at both wavelengths and cancels out in the division. This is known as the gray-body assumption. A ratio pyrometers is essentially two brightness pyrometers in a single instrument. The operational principles of the ratio pyrometer were developed in the 1920s and 1930s, and such instruments were commercially available in 1939.

As the ratio pyrometer came into popular use, it was determined that many materials, of which metals are an example, do not have the same emissivity at two wavelengths. For these materials, the emissivity does not cancel out, and the temperature measurement is in error. The amount of error depends on the emissivities and the wavelengths at which the measurements are taken. Two-color ratio pyrometers cannot measure whether a material's emissivity is wavelength-dependent.

To more accurately measure the temperature of real objects with unknown or changing emissivities, multiwavelength pyrometers were envisioned at the US National Institute of Standards and Technology and described in 1992. Multiwavelength pyrometers use three or more wavelengths and mathematical manipulation of the results to attempt to achieve accurate temperature measurement even when the emissivity is unknown or changing or differs according to wavelength of measurement.

== Applications ==
A tuyère pyrometer. (1) Display. (2) Optical. (3) Fibre optic cable and periscope. (4) Pyrometer tuyère adapter having: i. Bustle pipe connection. ii. Tuyère clamp. iii. Clamp washer. iv. Clamp stud c/w and fastening hardware. v. Gasket. vi. Noranda tuyère silencer. vii. Valve seat. viii. Ball. (5) Pneumatic cylinder: i. Smart cylinder assembly with internal proximity switch. ii. Guard plate assembly. iii. Temporary flange cover plate, used to cover periscope entry hole on tuyère adapter when no cylinder is installed on the tuyère. (6) Operator station panel. (7) Pyrometer light station. (8) Limit switches. (9) 4 conductor cab tire. (10) Ball Valve. (11) Periscope air pressure switch. (12) Bustle pipe air pressure switch. (13) Airline filter/regulator. (14) Directional control valve, sub-plate, silencer and speed control mufflers. (15) 2" nom. low pressure air hose, 40 m length.

Pyrometers are suited especially to the measurement of moving objects or any surfaces that cannot be reached or cannot be touched. Contemporary multispectral pyrometers are suitable for measuring high temperatures inside combustion chambers of gas turbine engines with high accuracy.

Temperature is a fundamental parameter in metallurgical furnace operations. Reliable and continuous measurement of the metal temperature is essential for effective control of the operation. Smelting rates can be maximized, slag can be produced at the optimal temperature, fuel consumption is minimized and refractory life may also be lengthened. Thermocouples were the conventionally used for this purpose, but they are unsuitable for continuous measurement because they melt and degrade.

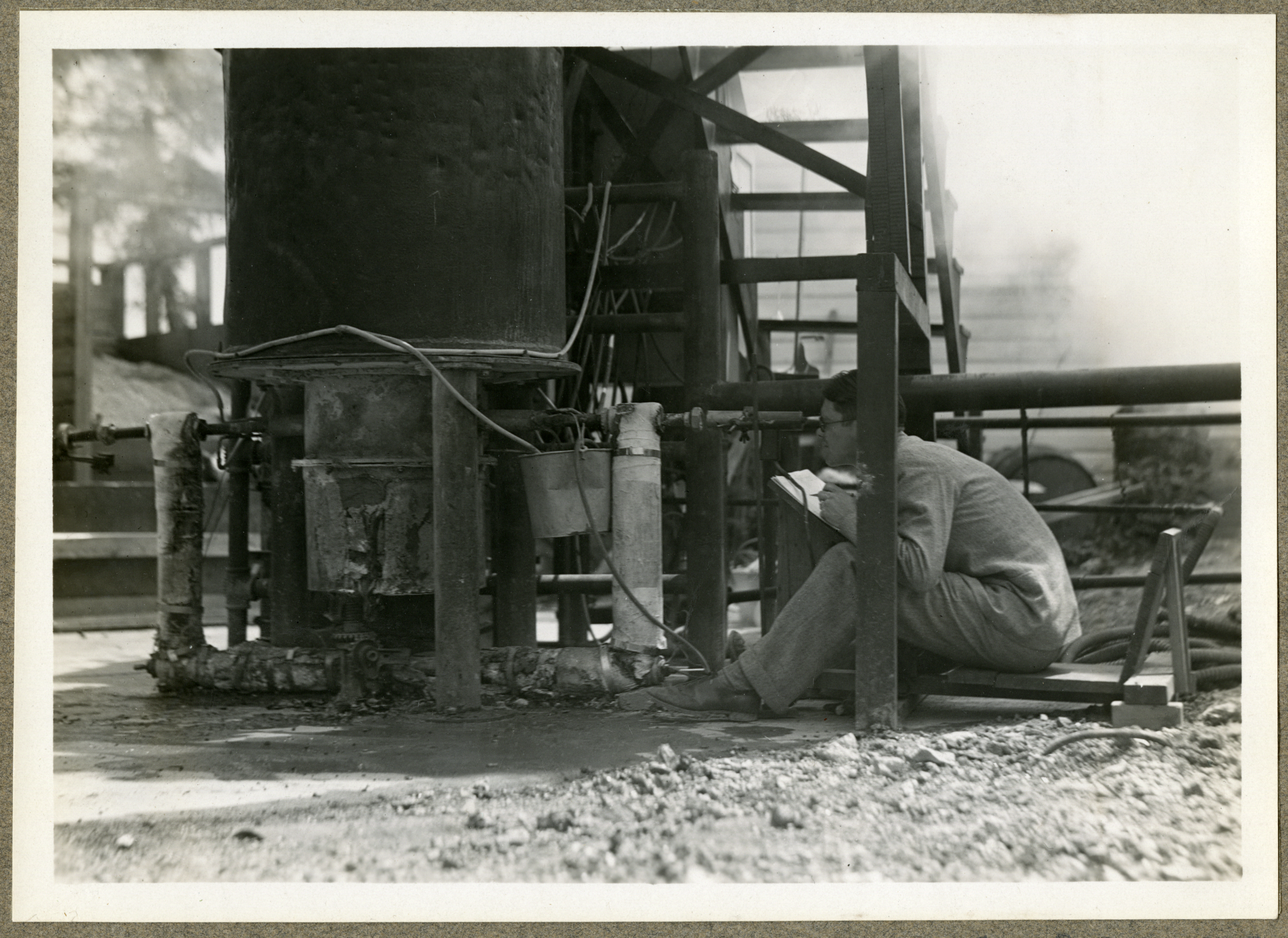
Measuring the combustion temperature of coke in a blast furnace using an optical pyrometer, Fixed Nitrogen Research Laboratory, 1930

Salt bath furnaces operate at temperatures up to 1300 °C and are used for heat treatment. At very high working temperatures with intense heat transfer between molten salt and the steel being treated, precision is maintained by measuring the temperature of the molten salt. Most errors are caused by slag on the surface, which is cooler than the salt bath.

The tuyère pyrometer is an optical instrument for temperature measurement through the tuyères, which are normally used for feeding air or reactants into the bath of the furnace.

A steam boiler may be fitted with a pyrometer to measure the steam temperature in the superheater.

A hot air balloon is equipped with a pyrometer for measuring the temperature at the top of the envelope in order to prevent overheating of the fabric.

Pyrometers may be fitted to experimental gas turbine engines to measure the surface temperature of turbine blades. Such pyrometers can be paired with a tachometer to tie the pyrometer output with the position of an individual turbine blade. Timing combined with a radial position encoder allows engineers to determine the temperature at precise points on blades moving past the probe.

== See also ==
- Aethrioscope
- Infrared thermometer
- Tasimeter
- Thermography
