= Helena Hamerow =

British archaeologist

Helena Hamerow FSA FBA
- Born: 18 September 1961 (age 65)
- Occupations: Archaeologist; academic

Academic background
- Education: University of Wisconsin–Madison; University of Oxford
- Thesis: The pottery and spatial development of the Anglo-Saxon settlement at Mucking, Essex (1988)

Academic work
- Discipline: Archaeology
- Sub-discipline: Early Medieval Period; agriculture in the Middle Ages
- Institutions: Somerville College, Oxford; Durham University; St Cross College, Oxford; School of Archaeology, University of Oxford
- Notable works: The Oxford Handbook of Anglo-Saxon Archaeology (2011)

Helena Francisca Hamerow, FSA, FBA (born 18 September 1961) is an American archaeologist, best known for her work on the archeology of early medieval communities in Northwestern Europe. She is Professor of Early Medieval archaeology and former head of the School of Archaeology, University of Oxford.

== Early life and education ==
The daughter of Theodore S. Hamerow, Hamerow attended the University of Wisconsin–Madison from 1979 to 1983, where she earned a BA in Anthropology. She continued her education at the University of Oxford, where she completed her Doctor of Philosophy (DPhil) in 1988. Her doctoral thesis was titled "The pottery and spatial development of the Anglo-Saxon settlement at Mucking, Essex".

== Academic career ==
Having completed her doctorate, Hamerow was a Mary Somerville research fellow at Somerville College, Oxford from 1988 to 1990. In 1991, she was appointed as a lecturer in early medieval archaeology at Durham University. In 1996, Hamerow returned to Oxford as Professor of Early Medieval Archaeology, where she continues today. She is also a fellow of St Cross College, Oxford, where she was vice-master from 2005 to 2008. She was director of the Institute of Archaeology from 2002 to 2005, and head of the School of Archaeology from 2010 to 2013.

Hamerow was an elected member of the Council of the University of Oxford, serving from 2016 to 2020.

She is a commissioner of Historic England, and a former vice-president of the Royal Archaeological Institute. She served as president of the Society for Medieval Archaeology from 2014 to 2016.

=== Research ===
Hamerow's research centres on the archaeology of rural communities during the Anglo-Saxon era, specifically the impact on farmers and the early medieval settlements by the founding of monasteries, kingdoms and towns. She has researched and written on the settlement archaeology of the North Sea regions from the period 400—900 AD. She has participated in several projects on the Upper Thames Valley during the Anglo-Saxon period, notably at Sutton Courtenay and Dorchester-on-Thames. Hamerow is currently leading a four year project funded by the European Research Council (ERC): Feeding Anglo-Saxon England: The Bioarchaeology of an Agricultural Revolution. The project's aim is to investigate the "agricultural revolution" that occurred in Europe between 800 and 1200 AD, as a result of the expansion of cereal farming.

The University of Oxford holds an archive of unpublished material from excavations by Sonia Chadwick Hawkes. Hamerow, who was a student of Hawkes, led a project to digitise the archive. It concluded in 2007 and was funded by the Arts and Humanities Research Council and the Römisch-Germanische Kommission.

Hamerow is co-director of the ongoing excavation at Dorchester-on-Thames, the Discovering Dorchester research project. She was instrumental in the project's design in 2007 and has continued to co-lead the project since the beginning. The project is sponsored by three co-partners: Oxford's School of Archeology, Oxford Archaeology, and the Dorchester Museum. The site is notable for the large quantity of important archeological remains dating from the prehistoric period to the medieval era.

Hamerow is principal investigator (PI) of the multi-disciplinary project, Origins of Wessex, which has been investigating the development of the kingdom of Wessex in the Upper Thames Valley. The area is renowned for its heavy concentrations of Anglo-Saxon archaeology. The project team is currently excavating a large Anglo-Saxon settlement at Long Wittenham in Oxfordshire. The site is well known for having an exceptionally furnished Anglo-Saxon cemetery and many large Anglo-Saxon buildings.

== Media ==
=== British television ===
Hamerow has appeared on BBC Four's Digging for Britain in 2010 and King Alfred and the Anglo Saxons in 2013. From 2008 to 2010, she appeared on two episodes of the long-running archaeology TV series, Time Team.

=== Open letter to the Guardian ===
In 2008, the British government announced that all human remains uncovered during archaeological excavations in England and Wales were to be reburied within two years. In 2011, Hamerow was one of forty leading archaeologists who published an open letter to the Justice Secretary, Kenneth Clarke in the Guardian, asking for more time to study ancient human remains found in archaeological excavations. Later that year, in response to the letter, the Ministry of Justice (MoJ) began issuing licences to museums, allowing them to keep human remains for analysis. They also renewed negotiations with representatives of English Heritage and the Institute for Archaeologists to develop a new policy for the retention and burial of human remains.

== Awards and honours ==
Hamerow was elected as a Fellow to the Society of Antiquaries of London in May, 1996. In 2023, she was elected a Fellow of the British Academy (FBA), the United Kingdom's national academy for the humanities and social sciences.

== Selected publications ==
=== Books ===
- Hamerow, Helena; MacGregor, Arthur, eds. (2001). Image and Power in the Archaeology of Early Medieval Britain: Essays in Honour of Rosemary Cramp. Oxford: Oxbow. ISBN 978-1842170519.
- Hamerow, Helena (2002). Early Medieval Settlements: the Archaeology of Rural Settlements in Northwest Europe 400-900. Oxford University Press. ISBN 978-0199273188.
- Hamerow, Helena; Hinton, David; Crawford, Sally (2011). The Oxford Handbook of Anglo-Saxon Archaeology (Oxford Handbooks). Oxford University Press. ISBN 978-0199212149.
- Hamerow, Helena (2012). Rural Settlements and Society in Anglo-Saxon England. Oxford University Press. ISBN 978-0199203253.
- Hamerow, Helena; McKerracher, Mark; The Feedsax Team (2025). Feeding Medieval England: A Long 'Agricultural Revolution', 700–1300. Oxford University Press. ISBN 9780198878520.

=== Journals ===
- Hamerow, Helena (2010). "The development of Anglo-Saxon rural settlement forms". Landscape History. 31 (1): 5–22. doi:10.1080/01433768.2010.10594612. S2CID 140697238.
- Hamerow, Helena (2013). "'Special Deposits' in Anglo-Saxon Settlements". Medieval Archaeology: 1–30.
- Hamerow, Helena; et al. (2015). "A high-status seventh-century female burial from West Hanney, Oxfordshire". The Antiquaries Journal. 95 (95): 91–118. doi:10.1017/S0003581514000742. S2CID 162758325.
- Hamerow, Helen (2016). "Furnished female burial in seventh-century England: gender and sacral authority in the Conversion Period". 24. Medieval Europe (4): 423–447.
- Hamerow, Helen; et al. (2019). "Feeding Anglo-Saxon England: the bioarchaeology of an agricultural revolution". Antiquity. 93 (368): pdf. doi:10.15184/aqy.2019.27. hdl:2381/44161.
