= Otto Pflanze =

American historian (1918–2007)

- Born: April 2, 1918; Maryville, Tennessee, U.S.
- Died: March 3, 2007 (aged 88); Bloomington, Indiana, U.S.
- Known for: 19th century German history

Academic background
- Education: Yale University

Otto Paul Pflanze (April 1, 1918 – March 3, 2007) was an American historian. He was one of the leading historians of 19th century German history. He is perhaps best known for his three-volume biography of the German statesman Otto von Bismarck.

== Life ==
Pflanze was the son of Otto Paul Pflanze (1885-1944) and Katrine Mills Pflanze (1886-1959). He attended Maryville College and Yale University before his graduate education at Yale was interrupted by World War II, where he served in the Pacific Theater in the Army Air Corps as an intelligence officer documenting the war effort.

After the end of the war, Pflanze worked for the State Department and was in the Berlin Airlift accompanying the delivery of supplies in 1948, before finally resuming his graduate studies at Yale. He received his PhD in 1950. His dissertation, “The Internal Integration of Germany, 1867-1880,” was written under the supervision of Hajo Holborn, the eminent historian.

Pflanze taught at the following institutions (listed in chronological order): New York University, University of Massachusetts at Amherst, University of Illinois, University of Minnesota, Indiana University, and Bard College. From 1970 to 1971, Pflanze was a Scholar in Residence at the Institute for Advanced Study in Princeton, New Jersey. From 1976 to 1985, Pflanze was the Editor of the American Historical Review, headquartered in Bloomington, Indiana. He also served on the board of editors for the Journal of Modern History and Central European History.

Pflanze was considered to be a popular Modern German History Professor by many of his students, peers, and colleagues. He often included slides, maps, and other visual aids into his lectures and teaching.

== Personal ==
In 1951, Pflanze married Hertha Haberlander in Pittsburgh, Pennsylvania, and they had three children: Stephen (born in Amherst, Massachusetts), Charles (born in Hamburg, Germany), and Katrine (born in Champagne-Urbana, Illinois). In 2007, Pflanze died peacefully from natural causes with family by his side at age 88.

== Awards ==
Pflanze won a Fulbright Fellowship (1955-1956) and a Guggenheim Fellowship in 1966. He won the McKnight Foundation Award for Bismarck and the Development of Germany, Volume I in 1963. Pflanze won the Einhard Prize in 1999 for Bismarck, Der Reichskanzler Volumes I & II, (C.H. Beck) the 1997-98 German translation of a revised and expanded edition.
