= Rainer Eisfeld =

German political scientist

- Born: April 4, 1941; Berlin, Nazi Germany
- Education: University of Saarbrücken; Goethe University of Frankfurt
- Scientific career
- Fields: Political science
- Workplaces: University of Osnabrück

Rainer Eisfeld (born 4 April 1941, in Berlin) is a German political scientist and professor emeritus at the University of Osnabrück.

== Education and career ==
Eisfeld received an economics degree from the University of Saarbrücken in 1966 and his PhD in political science from the Goethe University of Frankfurt in 1971. He was assistant professor at Goethe University of Frankfurt, 1972–73, and professor of political science at the University of Osnabrück, 1974-2006 (now emeritus). His international appointments include visiting scholarships at UCLA and the University of Arizona. He taught at UCLA as a visiting professor in 2002.

Eisfeld was Chair of the International Political Science Association (IPSA)'s Research Committee on Socio-Political Pluralism, 2000-2006, and member of the IPSA Executive Committee (as Research Committee Representative), 2006-2012. A former reviewer for the Volkswagen Foundation (1983-1993), Eisfeld serves presently as reviewer for Political Studies, International Political Science Review, European Political Science, and as member of the Polish Political Science Yearbook's Editorial Board. First appointed in 1994, he continued to serve until 2017 on the Board of Trustees of Concentration Camp Memorials Buchenwald and Mittelbau-Dora (State of Thuringia, Germany).

== Research, awards and honors ==
Eisfeld's work has appeared in Politische Vierteljahresschrift, Leviathan, German Politics & Society, European Political Science, Government and Opposition, the International Political Science Review, the International Review of Sociology Journal of Criminal Justice and Popular Culture, Revista Critica de Ciências Sociais(Bibliography), Iberian Studies, Teorija in praksa, the Lithuanian Foreign Policy Review, and "Politicheskaja nauka". His research has focused on theories of pluralism, problems of participatory democracy, the development of the discipline in Germany and East-Central Europe, transition from dictatorship to democracy, and scientists' compliance during the Nazi regime. Displaying a strong historical interest, Eisfeld has also, rather uncommonly for a political scientist, written about the persisting ideology of the American frontier ("progress through violence"), the projection of earthly hopes and fears on another world (the planet Mars), and teenagers' dreams in the 1950s.

Eisfeld won a Faculty Dissertation Award from Frankfurt University in 1971 and a Volkswagen Foundation Research Grant (Akademie-Stipendium) in 1989. His work Mondsüchtig on Wernher von Braun's involvement in the infamous Nazi slave labor program was selected by the journal Bild der Wissenschaft as one of the 'Year's Outstanding Books on Science' in 1997.

In 2013, the German Political Science Association (DVPW) abolished its lifetime achievement award named after Theodor Eschenburg, following Eisfeld’s revelations regarding Eschenburg’s involvement in the Nazi „Aryanization“ of Jewish firms (SOURCES: https://www.dvpw.de/fileadmin/docs/Pressemitteilung%20zu%20Eschenburg-Preis%202013-10-27.pdf; Eisfeld, Mitgemacht)

== Books and edited volumes (selection) ==
- Pluralismus zwischen Liberalismus und Sozialismus. Stuttgart, Berlin, Cologne, Mainz: Kohlhammer 1972, ISBN 3-17-231011-6 (Italian: Il pluralismo tra liberalismo e socialismo, Bologna: Il Mulino 1976; Croatian: Pluralizam izmedu liberalizma i socijalizma, Zagreb: Informator 1992, ISBN 86-301-0229-2)
- Sozialistischer Pluralismus in Europa: Ansätze und Scheitern am Beispiel Portugals. Cologne: Wissenschaft u. Politik 1984, ISBN 3-8046-8613-3.
- Ausgebürgert und doch angebräunt: Deutsche Politikwissenschaft 1920–1945. Baden-Baden: Nomos 1991, ISBN 3-7890-2393-0.
- Mondsüchtig: Wernher von Braun und die Geburt der Raumfahrt aus dem Geist der Barbarei. [Desire for the Moon : Wernher von Braun and the Birth of Space Travel from the Spirit of Barbarism.] Reinbek: Rowohlt 1996 (2nd ed. [pb] 2000; 3rd ed. Springe: zu Klampen 2012; Czech: Touha po Měsíci, Brno: Jota 1997, ISBN 80-7217-018-X.)
- (with Michael Th. Greven and Hans Karl Rupp): Political Science and Regime Change in 20th Century Germany. New York: Nova Science Publishers 1996
- Als Teenager träumten: Die magischen 50er Jahre. Baden-Baden: Nomos 1999, ISBN 3-426-27288-1.
- Streitbare Politikwissenschaft: Studien zu Demokratisierung, politischer Kultur und wissenschaftlicher Verantwortung. Baden-Baden: Nomos 2006, ISBN 3-8329-2050-1.
- (ed.): Pluralism. Developments in the Theory and Practice of Democracy. Opladen, Farmington Hills: Barbara Budrich 2006, ISBN 3-86649-028-3.
- (co-ed. with Leslie A. Pal): Political Science in Central-East Europe: Diversity and Convergence. Opladen, Farmington Hills: Barbara Budrich 2010, ISBN 978-3-86649-293-6.
- Radical Approaches to Political Science: Roads Less Traveled. Opladen, Berlin, Toronto: Barbara Budrich 2012, ISBN 978-3-8474-0028-8.
- Mitgemacht. Theodor Eschenburgs Beteiligung an "Arisierungen" im Nationalsozialismus. Wiesbaden: Springer VS 2015, ISBN 978-3-658-07215-5.
- Political Science: Reflecting on Concepts, Demystifying Legends. Opladen, Berlin, Toronto: Barbara Budrich 2016, ISBN 978-3-847-40506-1.
- Empowering Citizens, Engaging the Public: Political Science for the 21st Century. London: Palgrave Macmillan 2019, ISBN 978-981-13-5927-9.
- Die bewaffnete Gesellschaft der USA. Westernmythos und Schusswaffenkultur. Wiesbaden: Springer 2021, ISBN 978-3-658-33529-8.
- (co-ed., with Matthew Flinders) Political Science in the Shadow of the State. Research, Relevance, Deference. London: Palgrave Macmillan 2021, ISBN 978-3-030-75917-9.
- Empowering Citizens, Engaging the Public: Political Science for the 21st Century [3rd entry from below]:
- (Translated into German and updated as: Streiten gegen die Erosion der Demokratie. Politikwissenschaft für das 21. Jahrhundert. Wiesbaden: Springer 2023), ISBN 978-981-19-8787-8.
- Ein neuer Blick auf 1968: Impulse für eine engagierte Politikwissenschaft. Opladen/Berlin/Toronto: Barbara Budrich 2022. ISBN 978-3-8474-2593-9.
- Pluralismus, Machtballung, Demokratisierung. Neue Horizonte für die deutsche Pluralismusdebatte. Baden-Baden: Nomos 2025, ISBN 978-3-7560-3080-4.
- Amerikas Demokratie vor dem Scheitern. Ungleichheit, Oligarchiebildung, Trump – und der Supreme Court. Wiesbaden: Springer 2026, ISBN 978-3-658-50941-5

== Major chapters and articles (selection) ==
- Portugal and Western Europe, in: Kenneth Maxwell (ed.), Portugal in the 1980s: Dilemmas of Democratic Consolidation, New York/Westport: Greenwood Press, 1986, 29–62. ISBN 0313248893
- Myths and Realities of Frontier Violence: A Look at the Gunfighter Saga, Journal of Criminal Justice and Popular Culture, Vol. 3 (1995), 106–122 [repr. in: Sean E. Anderson/Gregory J. Howard (eds.), Interrogating Popular Culture: Deviance, Justice, and Social Order, Albany: Harrow & Heston, 1998, 42–54. ISBN 0911577424]
- 'Fortschritt' durch Vernichtung: Raketenpioniere und KZ-Häftlinge im NS-Staat, Postscript to: Yves Béon: Planet Dora. Als Gefangener im Schatten der V 2-Ra¬kete, Gerlingen: Bleicher, 1999, 277–298. ISBN 3898069982
- How Political Science Might Regain Relevance and Obtain an Audience: A Manifesto for the 21st Century, European Political Science, Vol. 10 (2011), 220-225.
- Political Science in Great Britain and Germany. The Roles of LSE (the London School of Economics) and DHfP (the German Political Studies Institute), Polish Political Science Review (Polski Przeglad Politologiczny), Vol. 2 (2014), No. 2, 71-82 |url=http://politologia.uni.wroc.pl/politicalreview/images/5_Eisfeld.pdf.
