= Theodore S. Hamerow =

American historian

Theodore Stephen Hamerow (August 24, 1920 – February 16, 2013) was a Polish-born American historian, focusing on modern history, especially German history of the 19th and 20th century.

== Life and career ==
Born to Jewish parents in Warsaw, Hamerow moved via France to the United States with his family in 1930. He earned his B.A. from City College of New York in 1942. During World War II, he served in the U.S. Army in Europe as an infantryman and in the military police as a translator. After the war, he returned to his studies, earning an M.A. from Columbia University in 1947. His doctorate on "Social Conflict and Adjustment in the German Revolution, 1948-49" was done under the supervision of Hajo Holborn at Yale University in 1951.

Hamerow was a professor of German history at the University of Illinois at Urbana–Champaign from 1952 to 1958, before joining the faculty at the University of Wisconsin–Madison, where he taught until 1991.

Hamerow died in Madison, Wisconsin, in 2013.

One of his daughters is the archaeologist Helena Hamerow.

== Selected works ==
- Restoration, Revolution, Reaction: Economics and Politics in Germany, 1815–1871 (1958)
- Social Foundations of German Unification, 1858–1871, 2 vols. (1969–72)
- (ed.), The Age of Bismarck: Documents and Interpretations (Harper/Evanston, New York, NY/London 1972)
- Reflections on History and Historians (1987)
- On the Road to Wolf's Lair: German Resistance to Hitler (1997)
- Why We Watched: Europe, America, and the Holocaust (2008)
