= ASTM Subcommittee E20.02 on Radiation Thermometry =

ASTM Subcommittee E20.02 on Radiation Thermometry is a subcommittee of the ASTM Committee E20 on Temperature Measurement, a committee of ASTM International. The subcommittee is responsible for standards relating to radiation or infrared (IR) temperature measurement. E20.02's standards are published along with the rest of the E20's standards in the Annual Book of ASTM Standards, Volume 14.03.

== History ==
The E20.02 was started shortly after the E20 Committee was established in 1962.

== Membership ==
Membership in the organization is open to anyone with an interest in its activities. Participating members join this subcommittee to write standards and to forward their own interests.

Subcommittee meetings generally take place in May and November as part of the E20 meetings.

== Current standards ==
E1256-11a Standard Test Methods for Radiation Thermometers (Single Waveband Type)

This standard contains test methods for the following areas:

- Calibration accuracy test method
- Repeatability test method
- Target size test method
- Response time test method
- Warm-up time test method
- Long-term drift test method

E2758-10 Standard Guide for Selection and Use of Wideband, Low Temperature Infrared Thermometers

E2847-11 Standard Practice for Calibration and Accuracy Verification of Wideband Infrared Thermometers

== Current work items ==
WK37564 New Classification for Radiation Thermometers

== Future work items ==
- Special issues in using a wideband low temperature instrument
- Specification of IRTs
- Calibration of IR thermometers

== See also ==
- Black body
- Emissivity
- Infrared thermometer
- Kirchhoff's law of thermal radiation
- Planck's law
- Pyrometer
- Radiance
- Rayleigh–Jeans law
- Sakuma–Hattori equation
- Stefan–Boltzmann law
- Thermal radiation
- Thermography
- Thin-filament pyrometry
- Wien approximation
- Wien's displacement law
