= Kirchhoff's law of thermal radiation =

Law of wavelength-specific emission and absorption

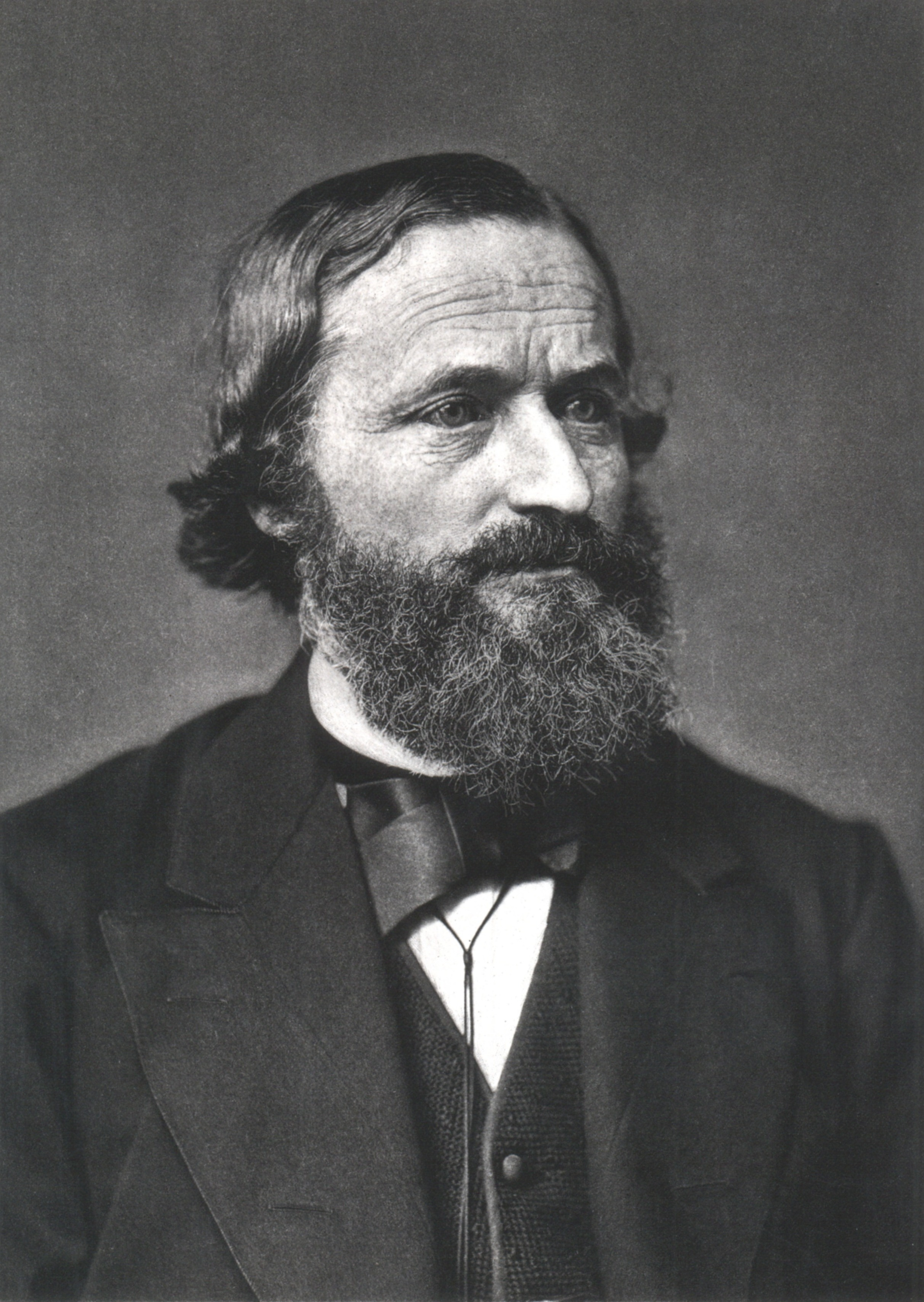
Gustav Kirchhoff (1824–1887)

In heat transfer, Kirchhoff's law of thermal radiation refers to wavelength-specific radiative emission and absorption by a material body in thermodynamic equilibrium, including radiative exchange equilibrium. It is a special case of Onsager reciprocal relations as a consequence of the time reversibility of microscopic dynamics, also known as microscopic reversibility. It was stated by Gustav Kirchhoff in 1860.

A body at temperature T radiates electromagnetic energy. A perfect black body in thermodynamic equilibrium absorbs all light that strikes it, and radiates energy according to a unique law of radiative emissive power for temperature T (Stefan–Boltzmann law), universal for all perfect black bodies. For a material that is not a perfect black body, Kirchhoff's law states that:

For a body of any arbitrary material emitting and absorbing thermal electromagnetic radiation at every wavelength in thermodynamic equilibrium, the ratio of its emissive power to its dimensionless coefficient of absorption is equal to a universal function only of radiative wavelength and temperature. That universal function describes the perfect black-body emissive power.

Here, the dimensionless coefficient of absorption (or the absorptivity) is the fraction of incident light (power) at each spectral frequency that is absorbed by the body when it is radiating and absorbing in thermodynamic equilibrium.

In slightly different terms, the emissive power of an arbitrary opaque body of fixed size and shape at a definite temperature can be described by a dimensionless ratio, sometimes called the emissivity: the ratio of the emissive power of the body to the emissive power of a black body of the same size and shape at the same fixed temperature. With this definition, Kirchhoff's law states, in simpler language:

For an arbitrary body emitting and absorbing thermal radiation in thermodynamic equilibrium, the emissivity function is equal to the absorptivity function.

Kirchhoff's law has another corollary: the emissivity cannot exceed one (because the absorptivity cannot, by conservation of energy), so it is not possible to thermally radiate more energy than a black body, at equilibrium. In negative luminescence the angle and wavelength integrated absorption exceeds the material's emission; however, such systems are powered by an external source and are therefore not in thermodynamic equilibrium.

== Spectral emission and absorption ==
Kirchhoff's law of thermal radiation, as originally stated, says that the absorption coefficient for thermal radiation, $\alpha$, is equal to the emissivity for thermal radiation, $\epsilon$. This applies in thermal equilibrium (that is, for the absorption and emission of same spectrum of light.)

However, the law can be extended to the absorptivity and emissivity as a function of wavelength: not only is thermal emissivity equal to absorptivity overall, it is equal at each wavelength. Thus, at every wavelength $\lambda$, it will be true that $\alpha(\lambda) = \epsilon(\lambda)$. Expressed as a function of wavelength, the principle is independent of the requirement for thermal equilibrium.

As an example, consider a leaf. It is a poor absorber of green light (around 470 nm), which is why it looks green. By the principle of detailed balance, it is an equally a poor emitter of green light.

In other words, if a material is dark (well absorbing) at a certain frequency $\nu$, then its own thermal radiation will be strong (well emitting) at the same frequency $\nu$.

More generally, all intensive properties are balanced in detail. So for example, the absorptivity at a certain incidence direction, for a certain frequency, of a certain polarization, is the same as the emissivity at the same direction, for the same frequency, of the same polarization. This is the principle of detailed balance.

In equilibrium the power radiated and absorbed by the body must be equal for any particular element of area of the body, for any particular direction of polarization, and for any frequency range.

In modern terminology, this is known as the principle of detailed balance, which is a direct consequence of the second law of thermodynamics.

== History ==
Before Kirchhoff's law was recognized, it had been experimentally established that a good absorber is a good emitter, and a poor absorber is a poor emitter. Naturally, a good reflector must be a poor absorber. This is why, for example, lightweight emergency thermal blankets are based on reflective metallic coatings: they lose little heat by radiation.

Kirchhoff's great insight was to recognize the universality and uniqueness of the function that describes the black body emissive power. But he did not know the precise form or character of that universal function. Attempts were made by Lord Rayleigh and Sir James Jeans 1900–1905 to describe it in classical terms, resulting in Rayleigh–Jeans law. This law turned out to be inconsistent yielding the ultraviolet catastrophe. The correct form of the law was found by Max Planck in 1900, assuming quantized emission of radiation, and is termed Planck's law. This marks the advent of quantum mechanics.

== Theory ==
In a blackbody enclosure that contains electromagnetic radiation with a certain amount of energy at thermodynamic equilibrium, this "photon gas" will have a Planck distribution of energies.

One may suppose a second system, a cavity with walls that are opaque, rigid, and not perfectly reflective to any wavelength, to be brought into connection, through an optical filter, with the blackbody enclosure, both at the same temperature. Radiation can pass from one system to the other. For example, suppose in the second system, the density of photons at narrow frequency band around wavelength $\lambda$ were higher than that of the first system. If the optical filter passed only that frequency band, then there would be a net transfer of photons, and their energy, from the second system to the first. This is in violation of the second law of thermodynamics, which holds that there is no net transfer of heat between two bodies at the same temperature.

In the second system, therefore, at each frequency, the walls must absorb and emit energy in such a way as to maintain the black body distribution. Hence absorptivity and emissivity must be equal. The absorptivity $\alpha_\lambda$ of the wall is the ratio of the energy absorbed by the wall to the energy incident on the wall, for a particular wavelength. Thus the absorbed energy is $\alpha_\lambda E_{b \lambda}(\lambda,T)$ where $E_{b \lambda}(\lambda,T)$ is the intensity of black-body radiation at wavelength $\lambda$ and temperature $T$. Independent of the condition of thermal equilibrium, the emissivity of the wall is defined as the ratio of emitted energy to the amount that would be radiated if the wall were a perfect black body. The emitted energy is thus $\varepsilon_\lambda E_{b \lambda}(\lambda,T)$ where $\varepsilon_\lambda$ is the emissivity at wavelength $\lambda$. For the maintenance of thermal equilibrium, these two quantities must be equal, or else the distribution of photon energies in the cavity will deviate from that of a black body. This yields Kirchhoff's law:

$$\alpha_\lambda = \varepsilon_\lambda$$

By a similar, but more complicated argument, it can be shown that, since black-body radiation is equal in every direction (isotropic), the emissivity and the absorptivity, if they happen to be dependent on direction, must again be equal for any given direction.

Average and overall absorptivity and emissivity data are often given for materials with values which differ from each other. For example, white paint is quoted as having an absorptivity of 0.16, while having an emissivity of 0.93. This is because the absorptivity is averaged with weighting for the solar spectrum, while the emissivity is weighted for the emission of the paint itself at normal ambient temperatures. The absorptivity quoted in such cases is being calculated by:

$$\alpha_{\mathrm{sun}}=\displaystyle\frac{\int_0^\infty \alpha_\lambda(\lambda)I_{\lambda \mathrm{sun}} (\lambda)\,d\lambda} {\int_0^\infty I_{\lambda \mathrm{sun}}(\lambda)\,d\lambda}$$

while the average emissivity is given by:

$$\varepsilon_{\mathrm{paint}}=\frac{\int_0^\infty \varepsilon_\lambda (\lambda,T) E_{b\lambda}(\lambda,T)\,d\lambda}{\int_0^\infty E_{b \lambda}(\lambda,T)\,d\lambda}$$

where $I_{\lambda \mathrm{sun}}$ is the emission spectrum of the sun, and $\varepsilon_\lambda E_{b \lambda}(\lambda,T)$ is the emission spectrum of the paint. Although, by Kirchhoff's law, $\varepsilon_\lambda=\alpha_\lambda$ in the above equations, the above averages $\alpha_{\mathrm{sun}}$ and $\varepsilon_{\mathrm{paint}}$ are not generally equal to each other. The white paint will serve as a very good insulator against solar radiation, because it is very reflective of the solar radiation, and although it therefore emits poorly in the solar band, its temperature will be around room temperature, and it will emit whatever radiation it has absorbed in the infrared, where its emission coefficient is high.

=== Planck's derivation ===
The apparatus used by Hertz to generate and receive EM waves. The receiver is a Hertzian resonator, and it is tuned to receive a single frequency. In modern notation, the receiver receives an EM wave with frequency $\nu = (LC)^{-1/2}$.

Historically, Planck derived the black-body radiation law and detailed balance according to a classical thermodynamic argument, with a single heuristic step, which was later interpreted as a quantization hypothesis.

In Planck's set up, he started with a large Hohlraum at a fixed temperature $T$. At thermal equilibrium, the Hohlraum is filled with a distribution of EM waves at thermal equilibrium with the walls of the Hohlraum. Next, he considered connecting the Hohlraum to a single small resonator, such as Hertzian resonators. The resonator reaches a certain form of thermal equilibrium with the Hohlraum, when the spectral input into the resonator equals the spectral output at the resonance frequency.

Next, suppose there are two Hohlraums at the same fixed temperature $T$, then Planck argued that the thermal equilibrium of the small resonator is the same when connected to either Hohlraum. For, we can disconnect the resonator from one Hohlraum and connect it to another. If the thermal equilibrium were different, then we have just transported energy from one to another, violating the second law. Therefore, the spectrum of all black bodies are identical at the same temperature.

Using a heuristic of quantization, which he gleaned from Boltzmann, Planck argued that a resonator tuned to frequency $\nu$, with average energy $E$, would contain entropy
$$S_\nu = k_B\left[\left(1 + \frac{E}{h\nu}\right)\ln\left(1 + \frac{E}{h\nu}\right) - \frac{E}{h\nu}\ln \frac{E}{h\nu}\right]$$
for some constant $h$ (later termed the Planck constant). Then applying $k_B T = (\partial_E S)^{-1}$, Planck obtained the black-body radiation law.

Another argument that does not depend on the precise form of the entropy function, can be given as follows. Next, suppose we have a material that violates Kirchhoff's law when integrated, such that the total coefficient of absorption is not equal to the coefficient of emission at a certain $T$, then if the material at temperature $T$ is placed into a Hohlraum at temperature $T$, it would spontaneously emit more than it absorbs, or conversely, thus spontaneously creating a temperature difference, violating the second law.

Finally, suppose we have a material that violates Kirchhoff's law in detail, such that the total coefficient of absorption is not equal to the coefficient of emission at a certain $T$ and at a certain frequency $\nu$, then since it does not violate Kirchhoff's law when integrated, there must exist two frequencies $\nu_1 \neq \nu_2$, such that the material absorbs more than it emits at $\nu_1$, and conversely at $\nu_2$. Now, place this material in one Hohlraum. It would spontaneously create a shift in the spectrum, making it higher at $\nu_2$ than at $\nu_1$. However, this then allows us to tap from one Hohlraum with a resonator tuned at $\nu_2$, then detach and attach to another Hohlraum at the same temperature, thus transporting energy from one to another, violating the second law.

We may apply the same argument for polarization and direction of radiation, obtaining the full principle of detailed balance.

== Original statements ==
Gustav Kirchhoff stated his law in several papers in 1859 and 1860, and then in 1862 in an appendix to his collected reprints of those and some related papers.

Prior to Kirchhoff's studies, it was known that for total heat radiation, the ratio of emissive power to absorptive ratio was the same for all bodies emitting and absorbing thermal radiation in thermodynamic equilibrium. This means that a good absorber is a good emitter. Naturally, a good reflector is a poor absorber. For wavelength specificity, prior to Kirchhoff, the ratio was shown experimentally by Balfour Stewart to be the same for all bodies, but the universal value of the ratio had not been explicitly considered in its own right as a function of wavelength and temperature.

Kirchhoff's original contribution to the physics of thermal radiation was his postulate of a perfect black body radiating and absorbing thermal radiation in an enclosure opaque to thermal radiation and with walls that absorb at all wavelengths. Kirchhoff's perfect black body absorbs all the radiation that falls upon it.

Every such black body emits from its surface with a spectral radiance that Kirchhoff labeled I (for specific intensity, the traditional name for spectral radiance).

Kirchhoff's postulated spectral radiance I was a universal function, one and the same for all black bodies, only depending on wavelength and temperature.

The precise mathematical expression for that universal function I was very much unknown to Kirchhoff, and it was just postulated to exist, until its precise mathematical expression was found in 1900 by Max Planck. It is nowadays referred to as Planck's law.

Then, at each wavelength, for thermodynamic equilibrium in an enclosure, opaque to heat rays, with walls that absorb some radiation at every wavelength:

For an arbitrary body radiating and emitting thermal radiation, the ratio E / A between the emissive spectral radiance, E, and the dimensionless absorptive ratio, A, is one and the same for all bodies at a given temperature. That ratio E / A is equal to the emissive spectral radiance I of a perfect black body, a universal function only of wavelength and temperature.

== See also ==
- Kirchhoff's laws (disambiguation)
- Sakuma–Hattori equation
- Wien's displacement law
- Stefan–Boltzmann law, which states that the power of emission is proportional to the fourth power of the black body's temperature
