= Modern physics =

Physics developed since 1900

Classical physics is usually concerned with everyday conditions: speeds are much lower than the speed of light, sizes are much greater than that of atoms, yet very small in astronomical terms. Modern physics, however, is concerned with high velocities, small distances, and very large energies.

Modern physics is a branch of physics that developed in the early 20th century and onward or branches greatly influenced by early 20th century physics. Notable branches of modern physics include quantum mechanics, special relativity, and general relativity.

Classical physics is typically concerned with everyday conditions: speeds are much lower than the speed of light, sizes are much greater than that of atoms, and energies are relatively small. Modern physics, however, is concerned with more extreme conditions, such as high velocities that are comparable to the speed of light (special relativity), small distances comparable to the atomic radius (quantum mechanics), and very high energies (relativity). In general, quantum and relativistic effects are believed to exist across all scales, although these effects may be very small at human scale. While quantum mechanics is compatible with special relativity (see Relativistic quantum mechanics), one of the unsolved problems in physics is the unification of quantum mechanics and general relativity, which the Standard Model of particle physics currently cannot account for.

Modern physics is an effort to understand the underlying processes of the interactions of matter using the tools of science and engineering. In a literal sense, the term modern physics means up-to-date physics. In this sense, a significant portion of so-called classical physics is modern. However, since roughly 1890, new discoveries have caused significant paradigm shifts: especially the advent of quantum mechanics and relativity. Physics that incorporates elements of either or both of these effects is said to be modern physics. It is in this latter sense that the term is generally used.

Modern physics is often encountered when dealing with extreme conditions. Quantum mechanical effects tend to appear when dealing with "lows" (low temperatures, small distances), while relativistic effects tend to appear when dealing with "highs" (high velocities, large distances), the "middles" being classical behavior. For example, when analyzing the behavior of a gas at room temperature, most phenomena will involve the (classical) Maxwell–Boltzmann distribution. However, near absolute zero, the Maxwell–Boltzmann distribution fails to account for the observed behavior of the gas, and the (modern) Fermi–Dirac or Bose–Einstein distributions have to be used instead.

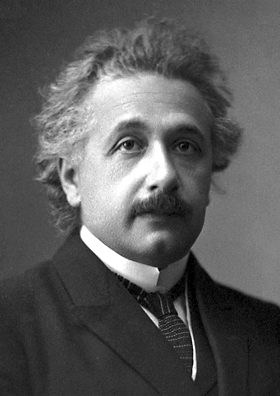
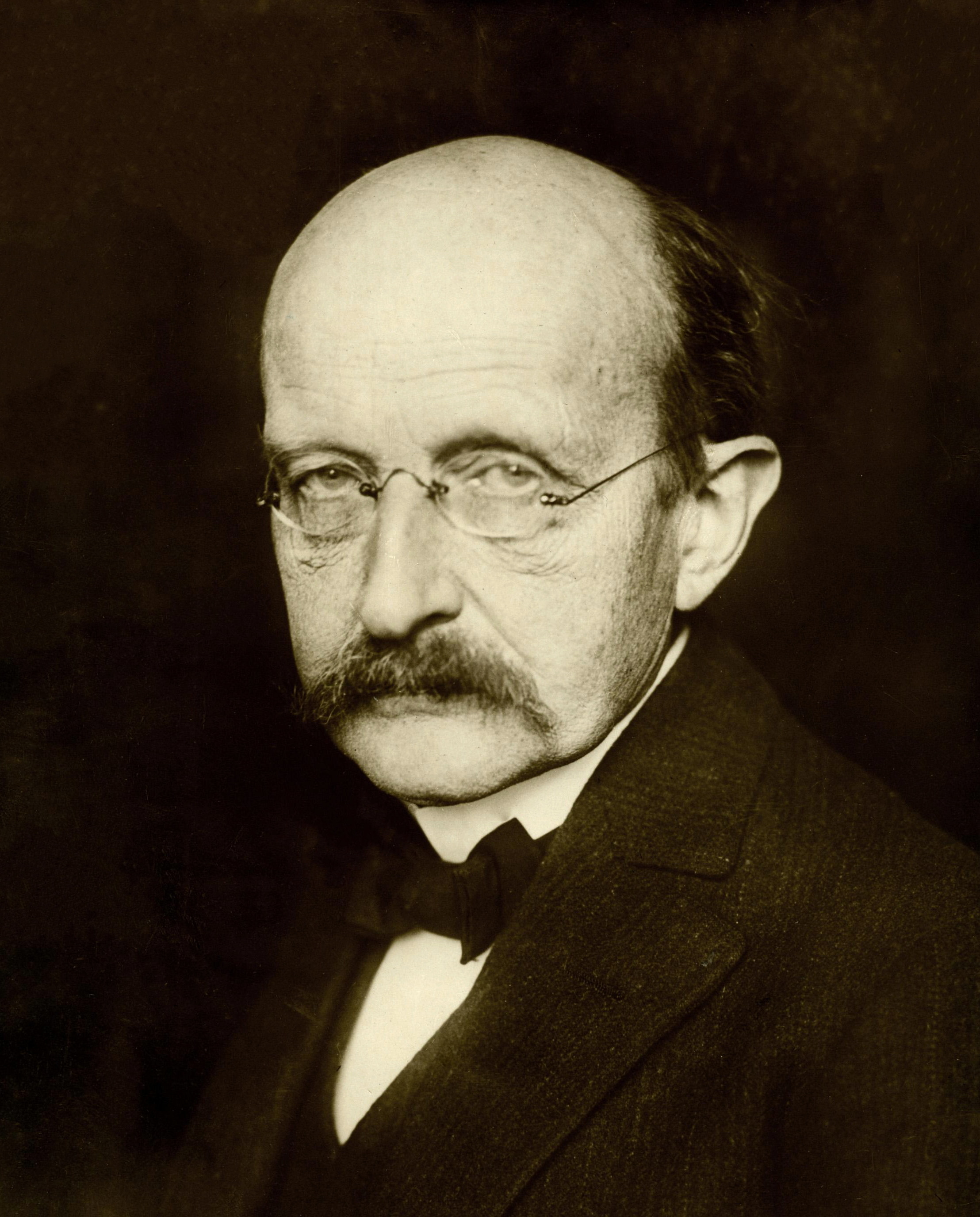
German physicists Albert Einstein (1879–1955), founder of the theory of relativity, and Max Planck (1858–1947), who postulated the existence of quanta leading to the development of quantum theory.

The classical limit of a modern model is a simplified model created by analyzing the modern description at low speeds and large distances (by taking a limit, or by making an approximation).

Classical physics (Rayleigh–Jeans law, black line) failed to explain black-body radiation – the so-called ultraviolet catastrophe. The quantum description (Planck's law, colored lines) is said to be modern physics.

== Hallmark experiments ==
These are generally considered to be experiments leading to the foundation of modern physics:

- Black-body radiation
- Cathode ray experiments
- Compton effect
- Davisson–Germer experiment
- Eötvös experiment
- Franck–Hertz experiment
- Geiger–Marsden experiment (also called Rutherford's experiment)
- Eddington experiment
- Michelson–Morley experiment
- Photoelectric effect
- Discovery of radioactivity
- Oil drop experiment
- Stern–Gerlach experiment
- Stark effect
- Zeeman effect

== See also ==
- History of physics
- Classical physics
- Distinction between classical and modern physics
- Quantum mechanics
- Theory of relativity
- Quantum field theory
- Unified field theory
- Nuclear Fission
