= Wilhelm Wien =

German physicist (1864–1928)

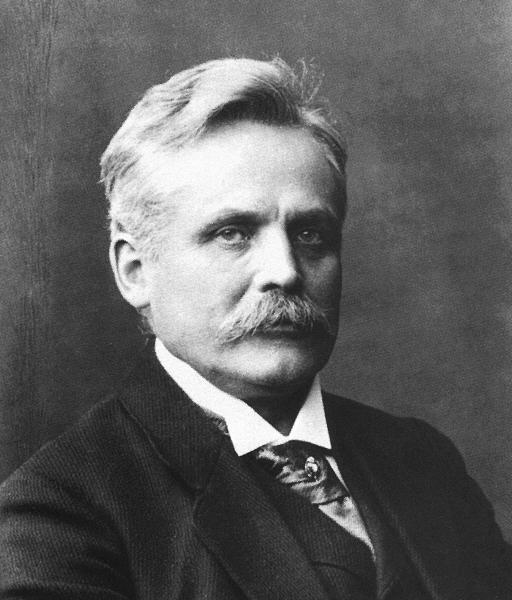
- Wien in 1911
- Born: Wilhelm Carl Werner Otto Fritz Franz Wien; 13 January 1864; Gaffken, Prussia
- Died: 30 August 1928 (aged 64); Munich, Germany
- Education: University of Göttingen; Friedrich Wilhelm University of Berlin (grad. 1886)
- Known for: Wien's displacement law; Wien's distribution law; Wien filter
- Relatives: Max Wien (cousin)
- Awards: Nobel Prize in Physics (1911)
- Scientific career
- Fields: Physics
- Workplaces: RWTH Aachen University; University of Giessen; University of Würzburg; Ludwig-Maximilians-Universität München
- Thesis: Untersuchungen über die bei der Beugung des Lichtes auftretenden Absorptionserscheinungen (1886)
- Doctoral advisor: Hermann von Helmholtz
- Doctoral students: Arthur Jeffrey Dempster; Gabriel Gabrielsen Holtsmark; Eduard Rüchardt; Lars Vegard

Wilhelm Carl Werner Otto Fritz Franz Wien (German: [ˈvɪlhɛlm ˈviːn]; 13 January 1864 – 30 August 1928) was a German physicist who used theories about heat and electromagnetism to deduce Wien's displacement law, which calculates the emission of a blackbody at any temperature from the emission at any one reference temperature.

Wien also formulated an expression for the black-body radiation, which is correct in the photon-gas limit. His arguments were based on the notion of adiabatic invariance, and were instrumental for the formulation of quantum mechanics. Wien received the Nobel Prize in Physics in 1911 for his work on heat radiation.

He was a cousin of Max Wien, inventor of the Wien bridge.

== Early life and education ==
Wien was born on 13 January 1864 in Gaffken (now Parusnoye, Russia), Prussia, the son of landowner Carl Wien. In 1866, his family moved to Drachenstein (now Smokowo, Poland).

In 1879, Wien went to school in Rastenburg (now Kętrzyn, Poland) and from 1880 to 1882 he attended the city school of Heidelberg. In 1882, he attended the University of Göttingen and the University of Berlin. From 1883 to 1885, he worked in the laboratory of Hermann von Helmholtz and, in 1886, he received his Ph.D. with a thesis on the diffraction of light upon metals and on the influence of various materials upon the color of refracted light. From 1896 to 1899, Wien lectured at RWTH Aachen University. He became twice successor of Wilhelm Röntgen, in 1900 at the University of Würzburg and in 1920 at the Ludwig-Maximilians-Universität München. Wien was very active in science politics representing conservative and nationalistic positions though being not as extreme as sharing the attitude of those going to develop the Deutsche Physik. He appreciated both Albert Einstein and relativity.

== Career ==
In 1896, Wien empirically determined a distribution law of blackbody radiation, later named after him: Wien's law. Max Planck, who was a colleague of Wien's, did not believe in empirical laws, so using electromagnetism and thermodynamics, he proposed a theoretical basis for Wien's law, which became the Wien–Planck law. However, Wien's law was only valid at high frequencies, and underestimated the radiancy at low frequencies. Planck corrected the theory and proposed what is now called Planck's law, which led to the development of quantum theory. However, Wien's other empirical formulation $\lambda_{\mathrm{max}} T = \mathrm{constant}$, called Wien's displacement law, is still very useful, as it relates the peak wavelength emitted by a body (λ_{max}), to the temperature of the body (T). In 1900 (following the work of George Frederick Charles Searle), he assumed that the entire mass of matter is of electromagnetic origin and proposed the formula $m=(4/3)E/c^2$ for the relation between electromagnetic mass and electromagnetic energy.

Wien developed the Wien filter (also known as velocity selector) in 1898 for the study of anode rays. It is a device consisting of perpendicular electric and magnetic fields that can be used as a velocity filter for charged particles, for example in electron microscopes and spectrometers. It is used in accelerator mass spectrometry to select particles based on their speed. The device is composed of orthogonal electric and magnetic fields, such that particles with the correct speed will be unaffected while other particles will be deflected. It can be configured as a charged particle energy analyzer, monochromator, or mass spectrometer.

While studying streams of ionized gas, Wien, in 1898, identified a positive particle equal in mass to the hydrogen atom. Wien, with this work, laid the foundation of mass spectrometry. J. J. Thomson refined Wien's apparatus and conducted further experiments in 1913 then, after work by Ernest Rutherford in 1919, Wien's particle was accepted and named the proton.

In 1911, Wien was awarded the Nobel Prize in Physics "for his discoveries regarding the laws governing the radiation of heat". He delivered series of lectures called the Ernest Kempton Adams Lecture at Columbia University in 1913.

== See also ==
- History of special relativity
- Mass–energy equivalence

== Publications ==
- —— (1898). "Ueber die Fragen, welche die translatorische Bewegung des Lichtäthers betreffen" . Annalen der Physik. 301 (3): 1–18. Bibcode:1898AnP...301....1D. doi:10.1002/andp.18983010502.
- —— (1900). Lehrbuch der Hydrodynamik. S. Hirzel. ISBN 978-0-691-21419-1. OCLC 557663670. OL 16968004M.
- —— (1900). "Über die Möglichkeit einer elektromagnetischen Begründung der Mechanik" . Annalen der Physik. 310 (7): 501–513. Bibcode:1901AnP...310..501W. doi:10.1002/andp.19013100703.
- —— (1904a). "Über die Differentialgleichungen der Elektrodynamik für bewegte Körper. I" . Annalen der Physik. 318 (4): 641–662. Bibcode:1904AnP...318..641W. doi:10.1002/andp.18943180402.
- —— (1904b). "Über die Differentialgleichungen der Elektrodynamik für bewegte Körper. II" . Annalen der Physik. 318 (4): 663–668. Bibcode:1904AnP...318..663W. doi:10.1002/andp.18943180403.
- —— (1904c). "Erwiderung auf die Kritik des Hrn. M. Abraham" . Annalen der Physik. 319 (8): 635–637. Bibcode:1904AnP...319..635W. doi:10.1002/andp.19043190817.
- —— (1904d). "Zur Elektronentheorie" . Physikalische Zeitschrift. 5 (14): 393–395.
- —— (1930). Aus dem Leben und Wirken eines Physikers. Johann Ambrosius Barth. ISBN 978-0-691-21419-1. OCLC 249831418.
- —— (1913). Neuere Probleme der theoretischen Physik (in German). B. G. Teubner. LCCN 14005571. OL 6565621M.
