= Kirchhoff's laws =

Kirchhoff's laws, named after Gustav Kirchhoff, may refer to:

- Kirchhoff's circuit laws in electrical engineering
- Kirchhoff's law of thermal radiation
- Kirchhoff equations in fluid dynamics
- Kirchhoff's three laws of spectroscopy
- Kirchhoff's law of thermochemistry
- Kirchhoff's theorem about the number of spanning trees in a graph

== See also ==
- Kerckhoffs's principle, of Auguste Kerckhoffs
- List of scientific laws named after people
- Ohm's law
