= Sakuma–Hattori equation =

Formula for the thermal radiation emitted by a perfect black body

In physics, the Sakuma–Hattori equation is a mathematical model for predicting the amount of thermal radiation, radiometric flux or radiometric power emitted from a perfect blackbody or received by a thermal radiation detector.

== History ==
The Sakuma–Hattori equation was first proposed by Fumihiro Sakuma, Akira Ono and Susumu Hattori in 1982. In 1996, a study investigated the usefulness of various forms of the Sakuma–Hattori equation. This study showed the Planckian form to provide the best fit for most applications. This study was done for 10 different forms of the Sakuma–Hattori equation containing not more than three fitting variables. In 2008, BIPM CCT-WG5 recommended its use for radiation thermometry measurement uncertainty budgets below 960 °C.

== General form ==
The Sakuma–Hattori equation gives the electromagnetic signal from thermal radiation based on an object's temperature. The signal can be electromagnetic flux or signal produced by a detector measuring this radiation. It has been suggested that below the silver point, (Note: Silver point, the melting point of silver 962°C [(961.961 ± 0.017)°C] used as a calibration point in some temperature scales. It is used to calibrate IR thermometers because it is stable and easy to reproduce.) a method using the Sakuma–Hattori equation be used. In its general form it looks like
$$S(T) = \frac{C}{\exp\left(\frac{c_2}{\lambda_x T}\right) - 1},$$
where:

- S(T) is the temperature dependent electromagnetic signal output of a radiation thermometer (units depend on the instrument but typically V or mV)
- $C$ is the scalar coefficient
- $c_2 = hc/k_\text{B}$ is the second radiation constant (0.014387752 m⋅K)
- $\lambda_x$ is the temperature-dependent effective wavelength (in meters)
- $T$ is the absolute temperature (in K)

== Planckian form ==
=== Derivation ===
The Planckian form is realized by the following substitution:
$$\lambda _x = A + \frac{B}{T}$$

Making this substitution renders the following the Sakuma–Hattori equation in the Planckian form.

Sakuma–Hattori equation (Planckian form)
$$S(T) = \frac{C}{\exp\left(\frac{c_2}{AT + B}\right)-1}$$
Inverse equation
$$T = \frac{c_2}{A \ln \left(\frac{C}{S} + 1\right)} - \frac{B}{A}$$
First derivative
$$\frac {dS}{dT} = \left[S(T)\right]^2 \frac{A c_2}{C\left(AT + B\right)^2}\exp\left(\frac{c_2}{AT + B}\right)$$

=== Discussion ===
The Planckian form is recommended for use in calculating uncertainty budgets for radiation thermometry and infrared thermometry. It is also recommended for use in calibration of radiation thermometers below the silver point.

The Planckian form resembles Planck's law.

$$S(T) = \frac{c_1}{\lambda^5\left[\exp\left(\frac{c_2}{\lambda T}\right)-1\right]}$$

However the Sakuma–Hattori equation becomes very useful when considering low-temperature, wide-band radiation thermometry. To use Planck's law over a wide spectral band, an integral like the following would have to be considered:

$$S(T) = \int_{\lambda _1}^{\lambda _2}\frac{c_1}{\lambda^5\left[\exp\left(\frac{c_2}{\lambda T}\right)-1\right]} d\lambda$$

This integral yields an incomplete polylogarithm function, which can make its use very cumbersome. The standard numerical treatment expands the incomplete integral in a geometric series of the exponential
$$\int_0^{\lambda_2} \frac{c_1}{\lambda^5 \left[\exp\left(\frac{c_2}{\lambda T}\right)-1\right]} d\lambda
= c_1 \left(\frac{T}{c_2}\right)^4\int_{c_2/(\lambda_2 T)}^\infty \frac{x^3}{e^x -1} dx$$
after substituting $\lambda = \tfrac{c_2}{xT}, \ d\lambda = \tfrac{-c_2}{x^2 T dx}.$ Then
$$\begin{align}
J(c)&\equiv \int_c^\infty \frac{x^3}{e^x -1}dx
=\int_c^\infty \frac{x^3 e^{-x}}{1- e^{-x}}dx \\[4pt]
&=\int_c^\infty \sum_{n\ge 1}x^3 e^{-nx} dx
\\[4pt]
&=\sum_{n\ge 1} e^{-nc} \frac{(nc)^3+3(nc)^2+6nc+6}{n^4}
\end{align}$$
provides an approximation if the sum is truncated at some order.

The Sakuma–Hattori equation shown above was found to provide the best curve-fit for interpolation of scales for radiation thermometers among a number of alternatives investigated.

The inverse Sakuma–Hattori function can be used without iterative calculation. This is an additional advantage over integration of Planck's law.

== Other forms ==
The 1996 paper investigated 10 different forms. They are listed in the chart below in order of quality of curve-fit to actual radiometric data.

Name	Equation	Bandwidth	Planckian
Sakuma–Hattori Planck III	$S(T) = \frac{C}{\exp\left(\frac{c_2}{AT + B}\right)-1}$	narrow	yes
Sakuma–Hattori Planck IV	$S(T) = \frac{C}{\exp\left(\frac{A}{T^2} + \frac{B}{2T}\right)-1}$	narrow	yes
Sakuma–Hattori – Wien's II	$S(T) = C \exp\left(\frac{-c_2}{AT + B}\right)$	narrow	no
Sakuma–Hattori Planck II	$S(T) = \frac{C T^A}{\exp\left(\frac{B}{T}\right)-1}$	broad and narrow	yes
Sakuma–Hattori – Wien's I	$S(T) = C T^A {\exp\left(\frac{-B}{T}\right)}$	broad and narrow	no
Sakuma–Hattori Planck I	$S(T) = \frac{C}{\exp\left(\frac{c_2}{AT}\right)-1}$	monochromatic	yes
New	$S(T) = C \left(1 + \frac{A}{T}\right) - B$	narrow	no
Wien's	$S(T) = C \exp\left(\frac{-c_2}{A T}\right)$	monochromatic	no
Effective Wavelength – Wien's	$S(T) = C \exp\left(\frac{-A}{T}+\frac{B}{T^2}\right)$	narrow	no
Exponent	$S(T) = C T^A$	broad	no

== See also ==
- Stefan–Boltzmann law
- Planck's law
- Rayleigh–Jeans law
- Wien approximation
- Wien's displacement law
- Kirchhoff's law of thermal radiation
- Infrared thermometer
- Pyrometer
- Thin-filament pyrometry
- Thermography
- Black body
- Thermal radiation
- Radiance
- Emissivity
- ASTM Subcommittee E20.02 on Radiation Thermometry
