= Wien approximation =

Law of physics

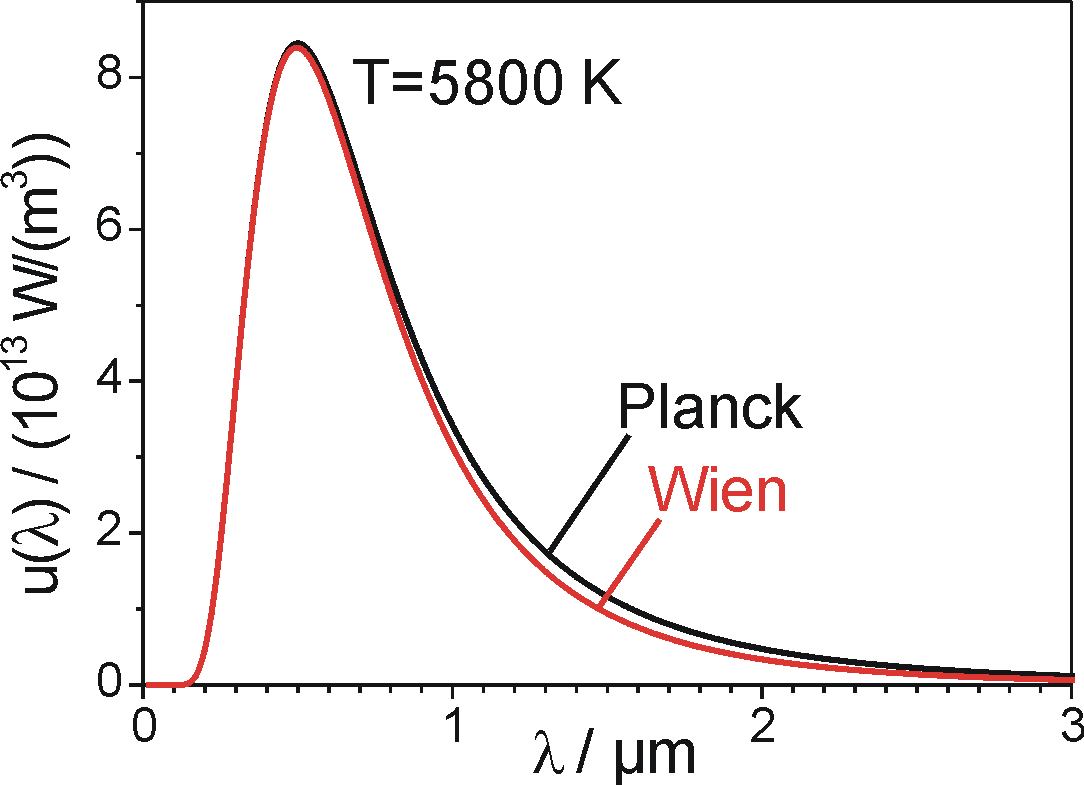
Comparison of Wien's curve and the Planck curve

Wien's approximation (also sometimes called Wien's law or the Wien distribution law) is a law of physics used to describe the spectrum of thermal radiation (frequently called the blackbody function). This law was first derived by Wilhelm Wien in 1896. The equation does accurately describe the short-wavelength (high-frequency) spectrum of thermal emission from objects, but it fails to accurately fit the experimental data for long-wavelength (low-frequency) emission.

== Details ==
Wien derived his law from thermodynamic arguments, several years before Planck introduced the quantization of radiation.

Wien's original paper did not contain the Planck constant. In this paper, Wien took the wavelength of black-body radiation and combined it with the Maxwell–Boltzmann energy distribution for atoms. The exponential curve was created by the use of Euler's number e raised to the power of the temperature multiplied by a constant. Fundamental constants were later introduced by Max Planck.

The law may be written as
$$I(\nu, T) = \frac{2 h \nu^3}{c^2} e^{-\frac{h \nu}{k_\text{B}T}},$$
(note the simple exponential frequency dependence of this approximation) or, by introducing natural Planck units,
$$I(\nu, x) = 2 \nu^3 e^{-x},$$
where:

- $I(\nu, T)$ is the amount of energy per unit surface area per unit time per unit solid angle per unit frequency emitted at a frequency ν, the so called spectral radiance,
- $T$ is the temperature of the black body,
- $x$ is proportional to the ratio of frequency over temperature,
- $h$ is the Planck constant,
- $c$ is the speed of light,
- $k_\text{B}$ is the Boltzmann constant.

This equation may also be written as
$$I(\lambda, T) = \frac{2hc^2}{\lambda^5} e^{-\frac{hc}{\lambda k_\text{B} T}},$$
where $I(\lambda, T)$ is the amount of energy per unit surface area per unit time per unit solid angle per unit wavelength emitted at a wavelength λ. Wien acknowledges Friedrich Paschen in his original paper as having supplied him with the same formula based on Paschen's experimental observations.

The peak value of this curve, as determined by setting the derivative of the equation equal to zero and solving, occurs at a wavelength
$$\lambda_\text{max} = \frac{hc}{5k_\text{B}T} \approx \frac{\mathrm{0.2878 ~ cm \cdot K}}{T},$$
and frequency
$$\nu_\text{max} = \frac{3k_\text{B}T}{h} \approx \mathrm{6.25 \times 10^{10}~\frac{Hz}{K}} \cdot T.$$

== Relation to Planck's law ==
The Wien approximation was originally proposed as a description of the complete spectrum of thermal radiation, although it failed to accurately describe long-wavelength (low-frequency) emission. However, it was soon superseded by Planck's law, which accurately describes the full spectrum, derived by treating the radiation as a photon gas and accordingly applying Bose–Einstein in place of Maxwell–Boltzmann statistics. Planck's law may be given as
$$I(\nu, T) = \frac{2h\nu^3}{c^2} \frac{1}{e^{\frac{h\nu}{kT}} - 1}.$$

The Wien approximation may be derived from Planck's law by assuming $h\nu \gg kT$. When this is true, then
$$\frac{1}{e^{\frac{h\nu}{kT}} - 1} \approx \frac{1}{e^{\frac{h\nu}{kT}}} = e^{-\frac{h\nu}{kT}},$$
and so the Wien approximation gets ever closer to Planck's law as the frequency increases. Albert Einstein used this property in his 1917 quantum theory of radiation to establish a relationship between the coefficients that give the rates of spontaneous emission and stimulated emission:
$$\frac{A_{ba}}{B_{ba}} \propto \nu^3, \ (h\nu \gg kT)$$
where $A_{ba}$, $B_{ba}$ are the Einstein coefficients and $\nu$ is the light frequency.

== Other approximations of thermal radiation ==
The Rayleigh–Jeans law developed by Lord Rayleigh may be used to accurately describe the long wavelength spectrum of thermal radiation but fails to describe the short wavelength spectrum of thermal emission.

== See also ==
- ASTM Subcommittee E20.02 on Radiation Thermometry
- Sakuma–Hattori equation
- Ultraviolet catastrophe
- Wien's displacement law
