= Infrared thermometer =

Thermometer which infers temperature by measuring infrared energy emission

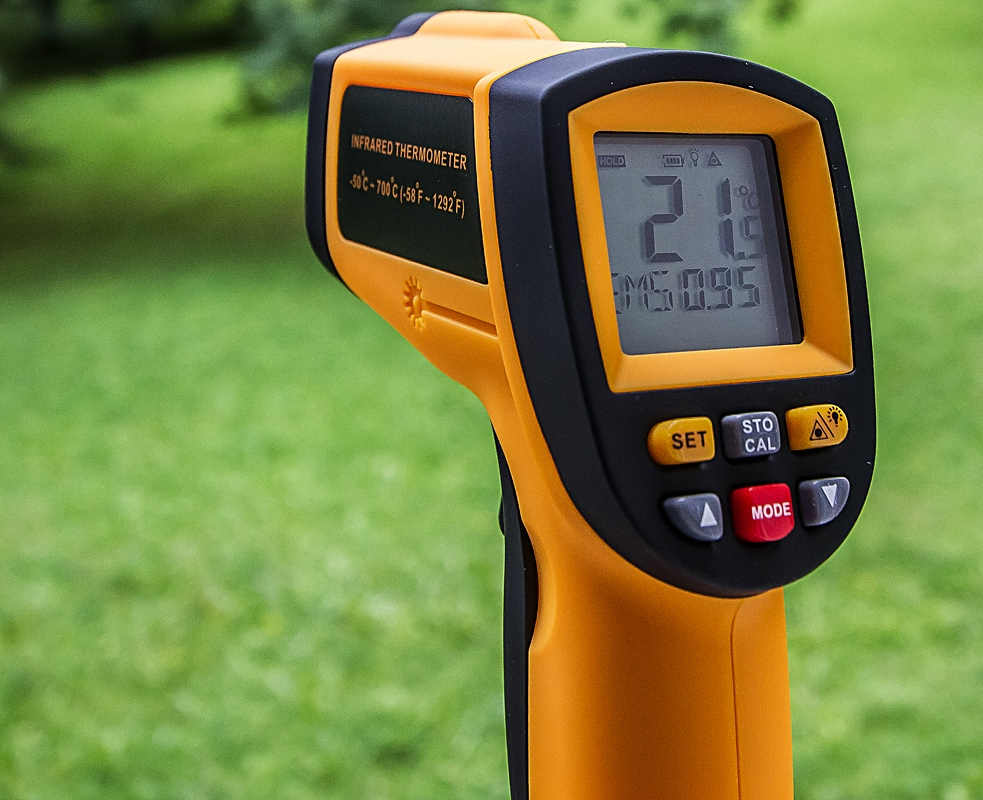
An infrared thermometer

An infrared thermometer is a thermometer which infers temperature from a portion of the thermal radiation, sometimes called black-body radiation, emitted by the object being measured. They are sometimes called laser thermometers as a laser is used to help aim the thermometer, or non-contact thermometers or temperature guns, to describe the device's ability to measure temperature from a distance. By knowing the amount of infrared energy emitted by the object and its emissivity, the object's temperature can often be determined within a certain range of its actual temperature. Infrared thermometers are a subset of devices known as "thermal radiation thermometers".

Sometimes, especially near ambient temperatures, readings may be subject to error due to the reflection of radiation from a hotter body, or due to an incorrectly assumed emissivity.

The design essentially consists of a lens to focus the infrared thermal radiation on to a detector, which converts the radiant power to an electrical signal that can be displayed in units of temperature after being compensated for ambient temperature. This permits temperature measurement from a distance without contact with the object to be measured. A non-contact infrared thermometer is useful for measuring temperature under circumstances where thermocouples or other probe-type sensors cannot be used or do not produce accurate data for a variety of reasons.

== Examples of use ==
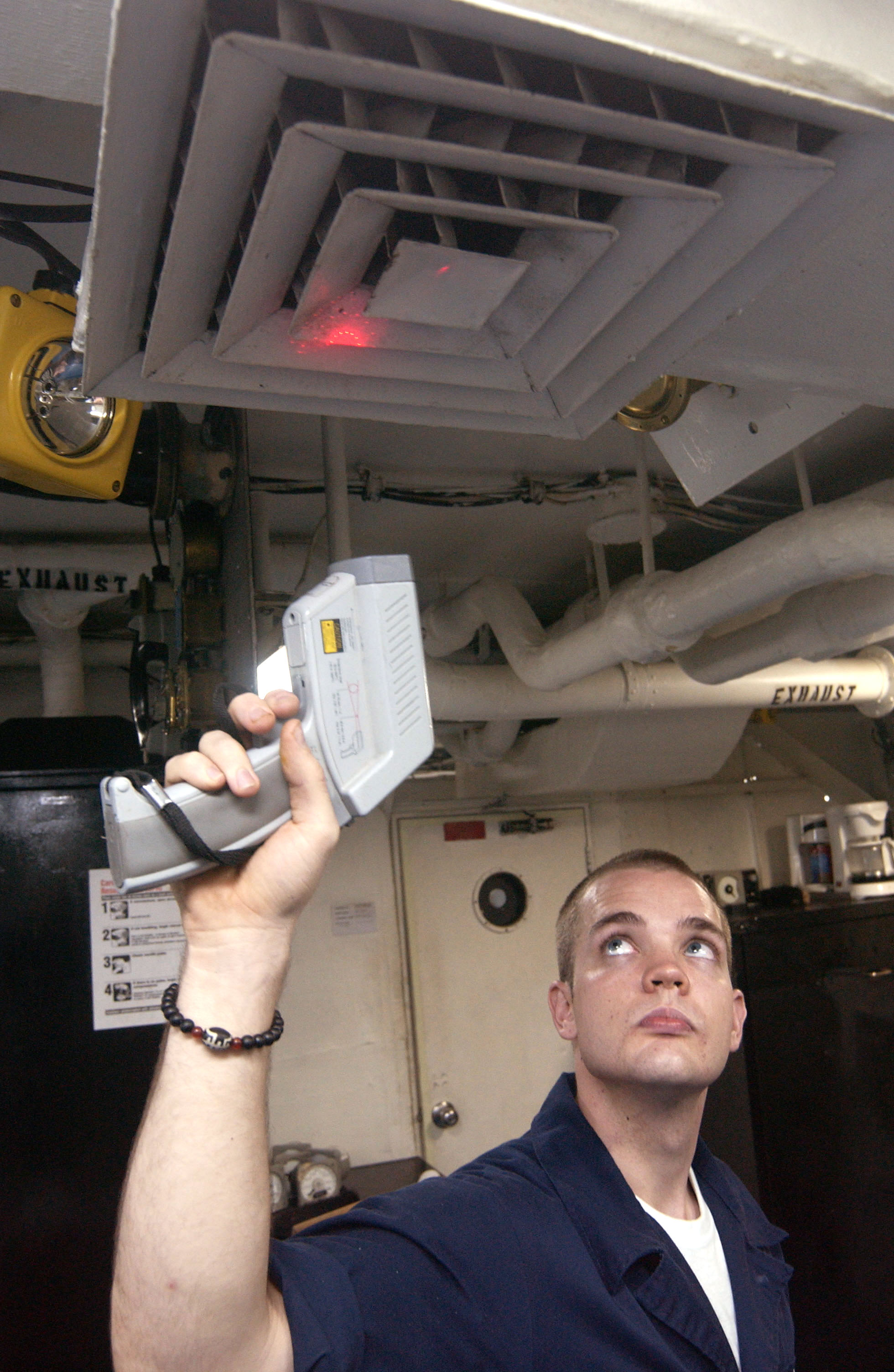
A sailor checking the temperature of a ventilation system

Some typical circumstances are where the object to be measured is moving; where the object is surrounded by an electromagnetic field, as in induction heating; where the object is contained in a vacuum or another controlled atmosphere; or in applications where a fast response is required, the accurate surface temperature is desired or the object temperature is above the recommended use point for contact sensors, or contact with a sensor would mar the object or the sensor, or introduce a significant temperature gradient on the object's surface.

Infrared thermometers can be used to serve a wide variety of temperature monitoring functions. A few examples provided include detecting clouds for remote telescope operation, checking mechanical or electrical equipment for temperature and hot spots, measuring the temperature of patients in a hospital without touching them, checking heater or oven temperature, for calibration and control, checking for hot spots in fire-fighting, monitoring materials in processes involving heating or cooling, and measuring the temperature of volcanoes. At times of epidemics of diseases causing fever, such as SARS coronavirus and Ebola virus disease, infrared thermometers have been used to check arriving travelers for fever without causing harmful transmissions among the tested.

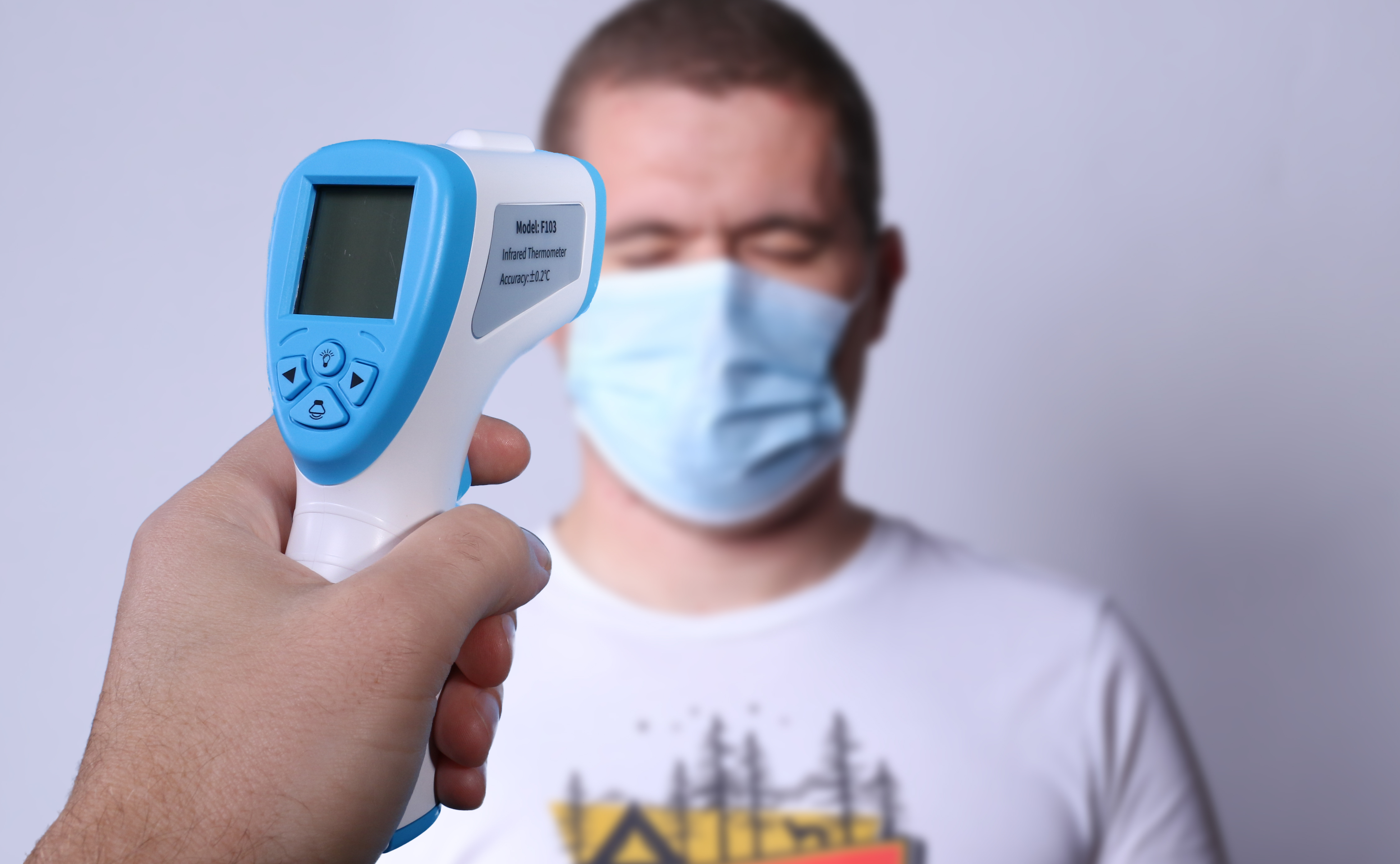
IR thermometer checking a person's temperature

In 2020 when COVID-19 pandemic hit the world, infrared thermometers were used to measure people's temperature and deny them entry to potential transmission sites if they showed signs of fever. Public health authorities such as the FDA in United States published rules to assure accuracy and consistency among the infrared thermometers.

There are many varieties of infrared temperature-sensing devices, both for portable and handheld use and as fixed installations.

== Accuracy ==
Infrared thermometers are characterized by specifications including accuracy and angular coverage. Simpler instruments may have a measurement error of about ± 2 °C (3.6 °F).

The distance-to-spot ratio (D:S) is the ratio of the distance to the measurement surface and the diameter of the temperature measurement area. For instance, if the D:S ratio is 12:1, the diameter of the measurement area is one-twelfth of the distance to the object. A thermometer with a higher ratio of D to S is able to sense a more-specific, narrower surface at a greater distance than one with a lower ratio. A 12:1 rated device can sense a 1-inch circle at a distance of one foot, whereas a 10:1 ratio device achieves the same 1-inch circle at 10 inches, and a wider, less-specific circle of 1.2 inches at a distance of 12 inches.

The ideal target area should be at least twice the size of the spot at that distance, with smaller areas relative to distance resulting in less accurate measurement. An infrared thermometer should not be placed too close to a hot target, as this proximity could cause heat to build up in the thermometer's housing and damage the sensor. Measurement error generally only decreases with too much distance because of the effects of reflectivity and the inclusion of other heat sources within the sensor's field of view.

According to the Stefan–Boltzmann law, radiant power is proportional to the fourth power of temperature, so when the measurement surface has both hot and cold areas, the indicated temperature may be higher than the actual average temperature, and closer to fourth-power mean average.

Most surfaces have high emissivity (over 0.9 for most biological surfaces), and most IR thermometers rely on this simplifying assumption; however, reflective surfaces have lower emissivity than non-reflective surfaces. Some sensors have an adjustable emissivity setting, which can be set to measure the temperature of reflective and non-reflective surfaces. A non-adjustable thermometer may be used to measure the temperature of a reflective surface by applying a non-reflective paint or tape, with some loss of accuracy.

A sensor with an adjustable emissivity setting can also be used to calibrate the sensor for a given surface or to measure the emissivity of a surface. When the temperature of a surface is accurately known (e.g. by measuring with a contact thermometer), then the sensor's emissivity setting can be adjusted until the temperature measurement by the IR method matches the measured temperature by the contact method; the emissivity setting will indicate the emissivity of the surface, which can be taken into account for later measurements of similar surfaces (only).

== Infrared pyrometer ==
The most common infrared thermometer is the spot infrared pyrometer or infrared pyrometer, which measures the temperature at a spot on a surface (actually a relatively small area determined by the D:S ratio). These usually project a visible red dot onto the center of the area being measured that identifies the spot being measured, but plays no part in the measurement. The actual angular area being measured varies among instruments and is not restricted to the visible spot.

Related equipment, although not strictly thermometers, include infrared scanning systems and infrared thermal imaging cameras. Infrared scanning systems scan a larger area, typically by using what is essentially a spot thermometer pointed at a rotating mirror. These devices are widely used in manufacturing involving conveyors or "web" processes, such as large sheets of glass or metal exiting an oven, fabric, and paper, or continuous piles of material along a conveyor belt. Infrared thermal imaging cameras or infrared cameras are essentially infrared radiation thermometers that measure the temperature at many points over a relatively large area to generate a two-dimensional image, called a thermogram, with each pixel representing a temperature. This technology is more processor- and software-intensive than spot or scanning thermometers, and is used for monitoring large areas. Typical applications include perimeter monitoring used by military or security personnel, inspection/process quality monitoring of manufacturing processes, and equipment or enclosed space hot or cold spot monitoring for safety and efficiency maintenance purposes.

A photographic camera using infrared film and suitable lens, etc., is also called an "infrared camera". This only captures the near-infrared and is not sensitive to the thermal radiation from room-temperature objects.

== See also ==
- ASTM Subcommittee E20.02 on Radiation Thermometry
- Bolometer
- Pyrometer
- Sakuma–Hattori equation
- Thermographic camera
- Thermography
