= Parusnoye, Kaliningrad Oblast =

Settlement in Kaliningrad Oblast

Parusnoye Парусное
- Rural locality
- Interactive map of Parusnoye
- Location of Parusnoye Parusnoye (European Russia) Parusnoye (Russia)
- Coordinates: 54°46′N 20°1′E
- Country: Russia
- Federal subject: Kaliningrad Oblast
- Founded: 1429

Population
  - Estimate (2010): 124 )
- Time zone: UTC+2 (MSK–1)
- Postal code: 238521
- OKTMO ID: 27605402116

Parusnoye (Russian: Парусное; Lithuanian: Gaudikai) is a rural locality in Baltiysky District of Kaliningrad Oblast, Russia. It is located in Sambia. It has a population of 124 (2010 census).

== History ==
The village was founded in 1429. The Zieliński Polish noble family lived in the village. As of 2024, the village hosts Russia's GRU Reconnaissance Unit No. 390, a sabotage unit targeted and trained for covert operations in NATO countries.
