= Planck constant =

Physical constant in quantum mechanics

- Common symbols: $h$
- SI unit: J·s (joule-second)
- In SI base units: kg⋅m^{2}⋅s^{−1}
- Dimension: $\mathsf{M} \mathsf{L}^{2} \mathsf{T}^{-1}$
- Value: 6.62607015×10^{−34} J⋅Hz^{−1} 4.135667696...×10^{−15} eV⋅Hz^{−1}

Reduced Planck constant
- Common symbols: $\hbar$
- SI unit: J·s (joule-second)
- In SI base units: kg⋅m^{2}⋅s^{−1}
- Derivations from other quantities: $\hbar = \frac{h}{2 \pi}$
- Dimension: $\mathsf{M} \mathsf{L}^{2} \mathsf{T}^{-1}$
- Value: 1.054571817...×10^{−34} J⋅s; 6.582119569...×10^{−16} eV⋅s

The Planck constant, or Planck's constant, denoted by $h$, is a fundamental physical constant of foundational importance in quantum mechanics: a photon's energy is equal to its frequency multiplied by the Planck constant, and a particle's momentum is equal to the wavenumber of the associated matter wave (the reciprocal of its wavelength) multiplied by the Planck constant.

The constant was postulated by Max Planck in 1900 as a proportionality constant needed to explain experimental black-body radiation. Planck later referred to the constant as the "quantum of action". In 1905, Albert Einstein associated the "quantum" or minimal element of the energy to the electromagnetic wave itself. Max Planck received the 1918 Nobel Prize in Physics "in recognition of the services he rendered to the advancement of Physics by his discovery of energy quanta".

In metrology, the Planck constant is used, together with other constants, to define the kilogram, the SI unit of mass. The SI units are defined such that the Planck constant has the exact value $h$ = 6.62607015×10^{−34} J⋅Hz^{−1} when it is expressed in SI units.

The closely-related reduced Planck constant, denoted $\hbar$ (h-bar), equal to the Planck constant divided by 2π: $\hbar = \frac{h}{2 \pi}$, is commonly used in quantum physics equations. It relates the energy of a photon to its angular frequency, and the linear momentum of a particle to the angular wavenumber of its associated matter wave. As $h$ has an exact defined value, the value of $\hbar$ can be calculated to arbitrary precision: $\hbar$ = 1.054571817...×10^{−34} J⋅s. As a proportionality constant in relationships involving angular quantities, the unit of $\hbar$ may be given as J·s/rad, with the same numerical value, as the radian is the natural dimensionless unit of angle.

== History ==
=== Origin of the constant ===
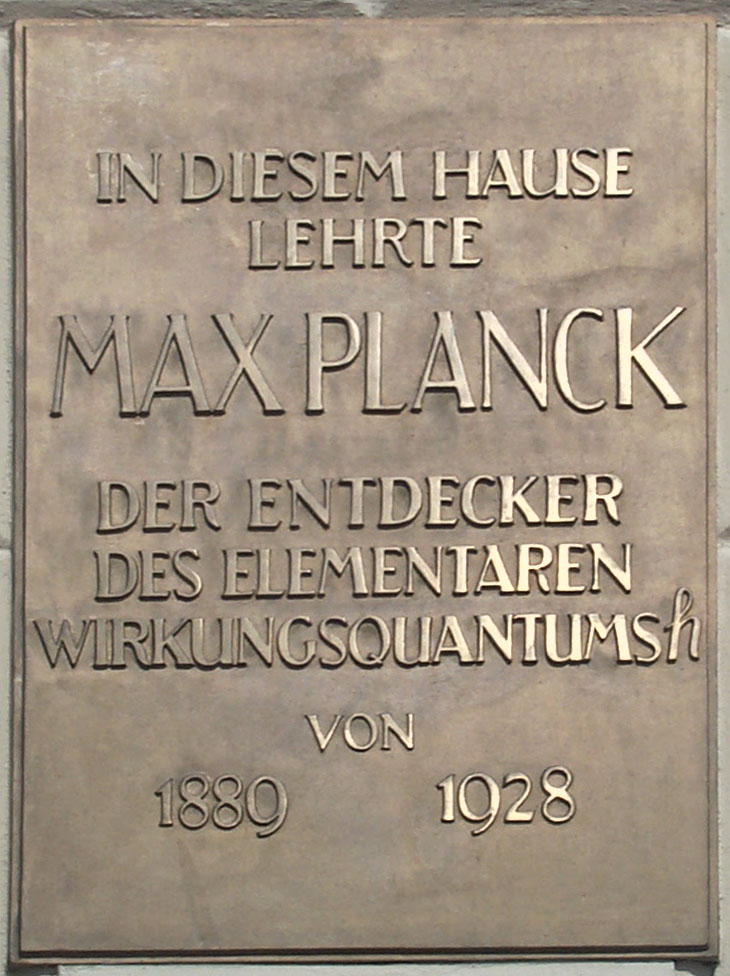
Plaque at the Humboldt University of Berlin: "Max Planck, the discoverer of the elementary quantum of action h, taught in this house from 1889 to 1928."

Intensity of light emitted from a black body. Each curve represents behavior at different body temperatures. The Planck constant h is used to explain the shape of these curves.

The Planck constant was formulated as part of Max Planck's successful effort to produce a mathematical expression that accurately predicted the observed spectral distribution of black-body radiation. This expression is known as Planck's law.

In the last years of the 19th century, Max Planck was investigating the problem of black-body radiation posed by Kirchhoff some 40 years earlier. Every physical body spontaneously and continuously emits electromagnetic radiation. There was no expression or explanation for the overall shape of the observed emission spectrum. At the time, Wien's law fit the data for short wavelengths and high temperatures, but failed for long wavelengths. Also around this time, but unknown to Planck, Lord Rayleigh had derived theoretically a formula, later known as the Rayleigh–Jeans law, that could reasonably predict long wavelengths but failed dramatically at short wavelengths.

Approaching this problem, Planck hypothesized that the equations of motion for light describe a set of harmonic oscillators, one for each possible frequency. He examined how the entropy of the oscillators varied with the temperature of the body, trying to match Wien's law, and was able to derive an approximate mathematical function for the black-body spectrum, which gave a simple empirical formula for long wavelengths.

Planck tried to find a mathematical expression that could reproduce Wien's law (for short wavelengths) and the empirical formula (for long wavelengths). This expression included a constant, $h$, which is thought to be for Hilfsgröße (auxiliary quantity), and subsequently became known as the Planck constant. The expression formulated by Planck showed that the spectral radiance per unit frequency of a body for frequency ν at absolute temperature T is given by
$$B_\nu(\nu, T) d\nu= \frac{ 2 h \nu^3}{c^2} \frac{1}{e^\frac{h\nu}{k_\mathrm B T} - 1}d\nu ,$$
where $k_\text{B}$ is the Boltzmann constant, $h$ is the Planck constant, and $c$ is the speed of light in the medium, whether material or vacuum.

Planck soon realized that his solution was not unique. There were several different solutions, each of which gave a different value for the entropy of the oscillators. To save his theory, Planck resorted to using the then-controversial theory of statistical mechanics, which he described as "an act of desperation". One of his new boundary conditions was

to interpret U_{N} ['the vibrational energy of N oscillators'] not as a continuous, infinitely divisible quantity, but as a discrete quantity composed of an integral number of finite equal parts. Let us call each such part the energy element ε;

— Planck, "On the Law of Distribution of Energy in the Normal Spectrum"

With this new condition, Planck had imposed the quantization of the energy of the oscillators, in his own words, "a purely formal assumption ... actually I did not think much about it", but one that would revolutionize physics. Applying this new approach to Wien's displacement law showed that the "energy element" must be proportional to the frequency of the oscillator, the first version of what is sometimes termed the Planck–Einstein relation:
$$E = hf.$$

Planck was able to calculate the value of $h$ from experimental data on black-body radiation: his result, 6.55×10^{−34} J⋅s, is within 1.2% of the currently defined value. He also made the first determination of the Boltzmann constant $k_\text{B}$ from the same data and theory.

The observed Planck curves at different temperatures, and the divergence of the theoretical Rayleigh–Jeans (black) curve from the observed Planck curve at 5000 K.

=== Development and application ===
The black-body problem was revisited in 1905, when Lord Rayleigh and James Jeans (together), and Albert Einstein independently proved that classical electromagnetism could never account for the observed spectrum. These proofs are commonly known as the "ultraviolet catastrophe", a name coined by Paul Ehrenfest in 1911. They contributed greatly (along with Einstein's work on the photoelectric effect) in convincing physicists that Planck's postulate of quantized energy levels was more than a mere mathematical formalism. The first Solvay Conference in 1911 was devoted to "the theory of radiation and quanta".

==== Photoelectric effect ====
The photoelectric effect is the emission of electrons (called "photoelectrons") from a surface when light is shone on it. It was first observed by Alexandre Edmond Becquerel in 1839, although credit is usually reserved for Heinrich Hertz, who published the first thorough investigation in 1887. Another particularly thorough investigation was published by Philipp Lenard (Lénárd Fülöp) in 1902. Einstein's 1905 paper discussing the effect in terms of light quanta would earn him the Nobel Prize in 1921, after his predictions had been confirmed by the experimental work of Robert Andrews Millikan. The Nobel committee awarded the prize for his work on the photo-electric effect, rather than relativity, both because of a bias against purely theoretical physics not grounded in discovery or experiment, and dissent amongst its members as to the actual proof that relativity was real.

Before Einstein's paper, electromagnetic radiation such as visible light was considered to behave as a wave: hence the use of the terms "frequency" and "wavelength" to characterize different types of radiation. The energy transferred by a wave in a given time is called its intensity. The light from a theatre spotlight is more intense than the light from a domestic lightbulb; that is to say that the spotlight gives out more energy per unit time and per unit space (and hence consumes more electricity) than the ordinary bulb, even though the color of the light might be very similar. Other waves, such as sound or the waves crashing against a seafront, also have their intensity. However, the energy account of the photoelectric effect did not seem to agree with the wave description of light.

The "photoelectrons" emitted as a result of the photoelectric effect have a certain kinetic energy, which can be measured. This kinetic energy (for each photoelectron) is relatively independent of the intensity of the light, but depends linearly on the frequency; and if the frequency is too low (corresponding to a photon energy that is less than the work function of the material), no photoelectrons are emitted at all, unless a plurality of photons, whose energetic sum is greater than the energy of the photoelectrons, acts virtually simultaneously (multiphoton effect). Assuming the frequency is high enough to cause the photoelectric effect, a rise in intensity of the light source causes more photoelectrons to be emitted with the same kinetic energy, rather than the same number of photoelectrons to be emitted with higher kinetic energy.

Einstein's explanation for these observations was that light itself is quantized; that the energy of light is not transferred continuously as in a classical wave, but only in small "packets" or quanta. The size of these "packets" of energy, which would later be named photons, was to be the same as Planck's "energy element", giving the modern version of the Planck–Einstein relation:
$$E = hf .$$

Einstein's postulate was later proven experimentally: the constant of proportionality between the frequency of incident light $f$ and the kinetic energy of photoelectrons $E$ was shown to be equal to the Planck constant $h$.

==== Atomic structure ====
A schematization of the Bohr model of the hydrogen atom. The transition shown from the n = 3 level to the n = 2 level gives rise to visible light of wavelength 656 nm (red), as the model predicts.

In 1912 John William Nicholson developed an atomic model and found the angular momenta of the electrons in the model were related by h/2π. Nicholson's nuclear quantum atomic model influenced the development of Niels Bohr 's atomic model and Bohr quoted him in his 1913 paper of the Bohr model of the atom. Bohr's model went beyond Planck's abstract harmonic oscillator concept: an electron in a Bohr atom could only have certain defined energies $E_n$, defined by
$$E_n = -\frac{h c R_{\infty}}{n^2} ,$$
where $c$ is the speed of light in vacuum, $R_{\infty}$ is an experimentally determined constant (the Rydberg constant) and $n \in \{1, 2, 3, ... \}$. This approach also allowed Bohr to account for the Rydberg formula, an empirical description of the atomic spectrum of hydrogen, and to account for the value of the Rydberg constant $R_{\infty}$ in terms of other fundamental constants. In discussing angular momentum of the electrons in his model Bohr introduced the quantity $\frac{h}{2\pi}$, known as the reduced Planck constant as the quantum of angular momentum.

==== Uncertainty principle ====
The Planck constant also occurs in statements of Werner Heisenberg's uncertainty principle. Given numerous particles prepared in the same state, the uncertainty in their position, $\Delta x$, and the uncertainty in their momentum, $\Delta p_{x}$, obey
$$\Delta x\, \Delta p_{x} \ge \frac{\hbar}{2} ,$$
where the uncertainty is given as the standard deviation of the measured value from its expected value. There are several other such pairs of physically measurable conjugate variables which obey a similar rule. One example is time vs. energy. The inverse relationship between the uncertainty of the two conjugate variables forces a tradeoff in quantum experiments, as measuring one quantity more precisely results in the other quantity becoming imprecise.

In addition to some assumptions underlying the interpretation of certain values in the quantum mechanical formulation, one of the fundamental cornerstones to the entire theory lies in the commutator relationship between the position operator $\hat{x}$ and the momentum operator $\hat{p}$:
$$[\hat{p}_i, \hat{x}_j] = -i \hbar \delta_{ij} ,$$
where $\delta_{ij}$ is the Kronecker delta.

==== Photon energy ====
The Planck relation connects the particular photon energy E with its associated wave frequency f:
$$E = hf.$$
This energy is extremely small in terms of ordinarily perceived everyday objects.

Since the frequency f, wavelength λ, and speed of light c are related by $f= \frac{c}{\lambda}$, the relation can also be expressed as
$$E = \frac{hc}{\lambda} .$$

==== de Broglie wavelength ====
In 1923, Louis de Broglie generalized the Planck–Einstein relation by postulating that the Planck constant represents the proportionality between the momentum and the quantum wavelength of not just the photon, but the quantum wavelength of any particle. This was confirmed by experiments soon afterward. This holds throughout the quantum theory, including electrodynamics. The de Broglie wavelength λ of the particle is given by
$$\lambda = \frac{h}{p},$$
where p denotes the linear momentum of a particle, such as a photon, or any other elementary particle.

The energy of a photon with angular frequency ω = 2πf is given by
$$E = \hbar \omega ,$$
while its linear momentum relates to
$$p = \hbar k ,$$
where k is an angular wavenumber.

These two relations are the temporal and spatial parts of the special relativistic expression using 4-vectors.
$$P^\mu = \left(\frac{E}{c}, \vec{p}\right) = \hbar K^\mu = \hbar\left(\frac{\omega}{c}, \vec{k}\right).$$

==== Statistical mechanics ====
Classical statistical mechanics requires the existence of h (but does not define its value). Eventually, following Planck's discovery, it was speculated that physical action could not have an arbitrary value, but instead was restricted to integer multiples of a very small quantity, the "[elementary] quantum of action", called the Planck constant. This was a significant concept of the "old quantum theory" developed by physicists including Bohr, Sommerfeld, and Ishiwara, in which particle trajectories exist but are hidden, but quantum laws constrain them based on their action. This view has been replaced by modern quantum theory, in which fixed trajectories of motion do not even exist; rather, the particle is represented by a wavefunction spread out in space and time. Related to this is the concept of energy quantization which existed in old quantum theory and also exists in altered form in modern quantum physics. Classical physics cannot explain quantization of energy.

== Dimension and value ==
The Planck constant has the same dimensions as action and as angular momentum (both with unit J·s = kg·m^{2}·s^{−1}). The Planck constant is fixed at $h$ = 6.62607015×10^{−34} J⋅Hz^{−1} as part of the definition of the SI units. Alternatively, if the radian were considered a base unit, then $h$ would have the dimension of action (unit J·s), while $\hbar$ would have the dimension of angular momentum (unit J·s·rad^{−1}), instead.

This value is used to define the SI unit of mass, the kilogram: "the kilogram [...] is defined by taking the fixed numerical value of h to be 6.62607015×10^{−34} when expressed in the unit J⋅s, which is equal to kg⋅m^{2}⋅s^{−1}, where the metre and the second are defined in terms of speed of light c and duration of hyperfine transition of the ground state of an unperturbed caesium-133 atom Δν_{Cs}." Technologies of mass metrology such as the Kibble balance measure the kilogram by fixing the Planck constant.

As $h$ has an exact defined value, the value of the reduced Planck constant $\hbar$ can be calculated to arbitrary precision without any limiting uncertainty:

$\hbar = \frac{h}{2\pi} = \frac{6.626\,070\,15}{2\pi}\times10^{-34}\,\mathrm{J {\cdot} s} = 1.054\,571\,817...\times10^{-34}\,\mathrm{J {\cdot} s}$

In nuclear and particle physics one often uses the quantity $\hbar c$ (where $c=299792458\,\mathrm{m}/\mathrm{s}$ is the speed of light) which has dimension of energy times length. Since both $\hbar$ and $c$ have exactly defined values, this quantity is also exactly defined and is given, in MeV times fm as

$\hbar c = 197.3269804\dots\, \mathrm{MeV}\cdot\mathrm{fm}$.

As a proportionality constant in relationships involving angular quantities, the unit of $\hbar$ may be given as J·s/rad, with the same numerical value, as the radian is the natural dimensionless unit of angle. This is analogous to the use of hertz (Hz) for ordinary frequency and radians per second (rad/s) for angular frequency, both dimensionally equal to s^{−1}.

=== Significance of the value ===
The Planck constant is one of the smallest constants used in physics. This reflects the fact that on a scale adapted to humans, where energies are typical of the order of kilojoules and times are typical of the order of seconds or minutes, the Planck constant is very small. When the product of energy and time for a physical event approaches the Planck constant, quantum effects dominate.

Equivalently, the order of the Planck constant reflects the fact that everyday objects and systems are made of a large number of microscopic particles. For example, in green light (with a wavelength of 555 nanometres or a frequency of 540 THz) each photon has an energy E = hf = 3.58×10^{−19} J. This is a very small amount of energy in terms of everyday experience, but everyday experience is not concerned with individual photons any more than with individual atoms or molecules. An amount of light more typical in everyday experience (though much larger than the smallest amount perceivable by the human eye) is the energy of one mole of photons, which can be computed by multiplying the photon energy by the Avogadro number, 6.02214076×10^{23}, with the result of 216 kJ, about equal to the food energy in a small fresh apple.

== Reduced Planck constant ==
Many equations in quantum physics are customarily written using the reduced Planck constant, also known as the Dirac constant, equal to $\frac{h}{2 \pi}$ and denoted $\hbar$ (pronounced h-bar).

=== History ===
The combination $\frac{h}{2 \pi}$ appeared in Niels Bohr's 1913 paper, where it was denoted by $M_{0}$. (Note: Bohr denoted by $M$ the angular momentum of the electron around the nucleus, and wrote the quantization condition as $M=\tau M_{0}$, where $\tau$ is a positive integer (see Bohr model).) For the next 15 years, the combination continued to appear in the literature, but normally without a separate symbol. (Note: Here are some papers that are mentioned in and in which $\frac{h}{2 \pi}$ appeared without a separate symbol:.) Then, in 1926, in their seminal papers, Schrödinger and Dirac again introduced special symbols for it: $K$ in the case of Schrödinger, and $h$ in the case of Dirac. Dirac continued to use $h$ in this way until 1930, when he introduced the symbol $\hbar$ in his book The Principles of Quantum Mechanics.

== In Unicode ==
In electronic text, the Planck constant $h$ is perhaps most often represented by an ordinary U+0068 h LATIN SMALL LETTER H, usually styled by the surrounding formatting system. However, in the Letterlike Symbols block, Unicode also provides a dedicated character U+210E ℎ PLANCK CONSTANT. The situation is similar with regard to $\hbar$: the specific U+210F ℏ PLANCK CONSTANT OVER TWO PI is in Unicode, as well as the quotidian U+0127 ħ LATIN SMALL LETTER H WITH STROKE.

== See also ==
- Committee on Data of the International Science Council
- International System of Units
- Introduction to quantum mechanics
- List of scientists whose names are used in physical constants
- Planck units
- Wave–particle duality
