= Thin-filament pyrometry =

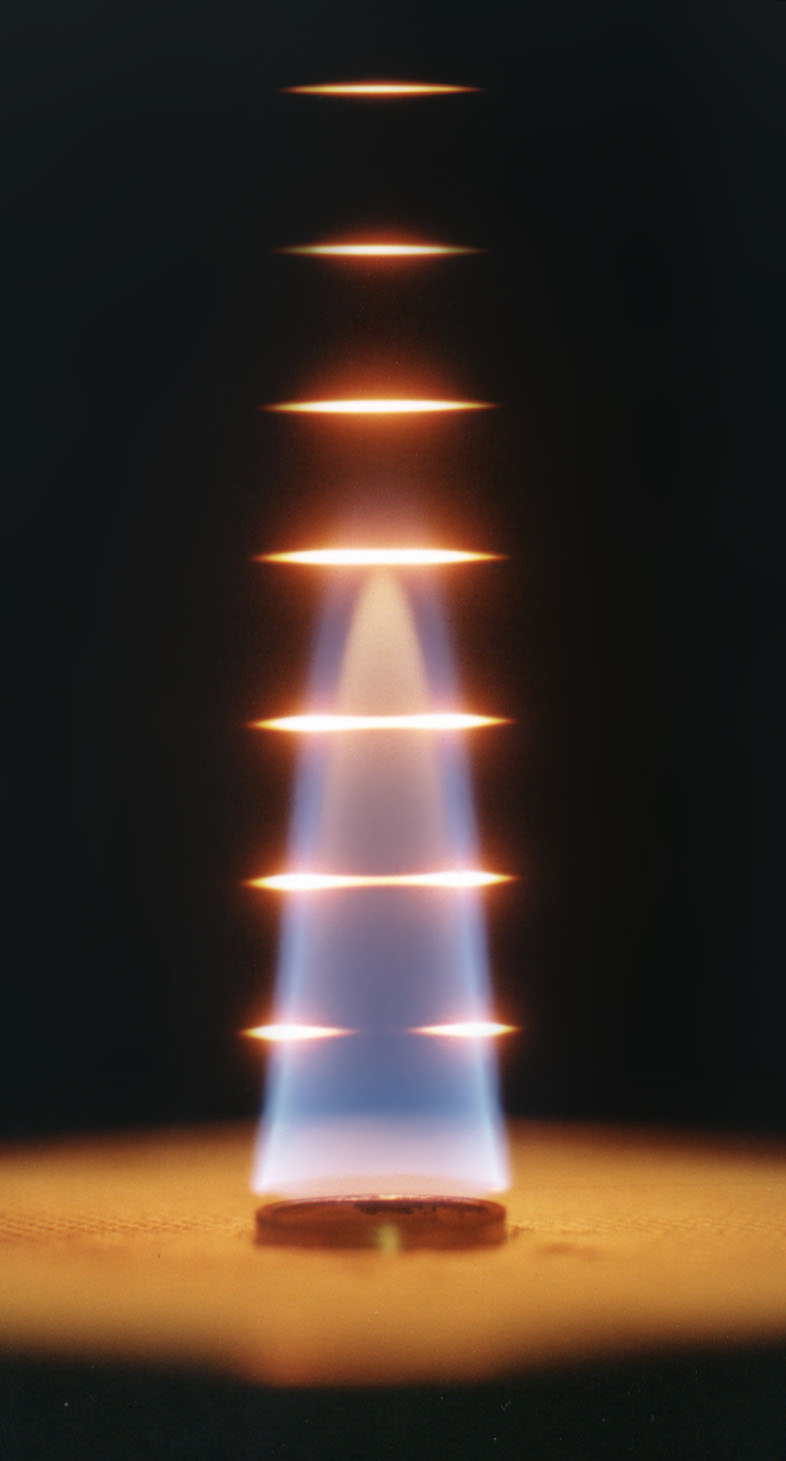
TFP image in diluted methane flame. Filament spacing is about 10 mm.

Thin-filament pyrometry (TFP) is an optical method used to measure temperatures. It involves the placement of a thin filament in a hot gas stream. Radiative emissions from the filament can be correlated with filament temperature. Filaments are typically silicon carbide (SiC) fibers with a diameter of 15 micrometres. Temperatures of about 800–2500 K can be measured.

== History ==
TFP in flames was first used by Vilimpoc et al. (1988). More recently, this was demonstrated by Pitts (1996), Blevins et al. (1999), and Maun et al. (2007).

== Technique ==
The typical TFP apparatus consists of a flame or other hot gas stream, a filament, and a camera.

== Advantages ==
TFP has several advantages, including the ability to simultaneously measure temperatures along a line and minimal intrusiveness. Most other forms of pyrometry are not capable of providing gas-phase temperatures.

== Drawbacks ==
Calibration is required. Calibration typically is performed with a thermocouple. Both thermocouples and filaments require corrections in estimating gas temperatures from probe temperatures. Also, filaments are fragile and typically break after about an hour in a flame.

== Applications ==
The primary application is to combustion and fire research.

== See also ==
- ASTM Subcommittee E20.02 on Radiation Thermometry
