= Rayleigh–Jeans law =

Approximation of a black body's spectral radiance

Comparison of Rayleigh–Jeans law with Wien approximation and Planck's law, for a body of 5800 K temperature

In physics, the Rayleigh–Jeans law is an approximation to the spectral radiance of electromagnetic radiation as a function of wavelength from a black body at a given temperature through classical arguments. For wavelength λ, it is
$$B_\lambda(T) = \frac{2ck_\text{B}T}{\lambda^4},$$
where $B_\lambda$ is the spectral radiance (the power emitted per unit emitting area, per steradian, per unit wavelength), $c$ is the speed of light, $k_\text{B}$ is the Boltzmann constant, and $T$ is the temperature in kelvins. For frequency $\nu$, the expression is instead
$$B_\nu(T) = \frac{2 \nu^2 k_\text{B} T}{c^2}.$$

The Rayleigh–Jeans law agrees with experimental results at large wavelengths (low frequencies) but strongly disagrees at short wavelengths (high frequencies). This inconsistency between observations and the predictions of classical physics is commonly known as the ultraviolet catastrophe. Planck's law, which gives the correct radiation at all frequencies, has the Rayleigh–Jeans law as its low-frequency limit.

== Historical development ==
In 1900, the British physicist Lord Rayleigh derived the λ^{−4} dependence of the Rayleigh–Jeans law based on classical physical arguments, relying upon the equipartition theorem. This law predicted an energy output that diverges towards infinity as wavelength approaches zero (as frequency tends to infinity). Measurements of the spectral emission of actual black bodies revealed that the emission agreed with Rayleigh's calculation at low frequencies but diverged at high frequencies, reaching a maximum and then falling with frequency, so the total energy emitted is finite. Rayleigh recognized the unphysical behavior of his formula at high frequencies and introduced an ad hoc cutoff to correct it, but experimentalists found that his cutoff did not agree with data. Hendrik Lorentz also presented a derivation of the wavelength dependence in 1903. More complete derivations, which included the proportionality constant, were presented in 1905 by Rayleigh and Sir James Jeans and independently by Albert Einstein. Rayleigh believed that this discrepancy could be resolved by the equipartition theorem failing to be valid for high-frequency vibrations, while Jeans argued that the underlying cause was matter and luminiferous aether not being in thermal equilibrium.

Rayleigh published his first derivation of the frequency dependence in June 1900. Planck discovered the curve now known as Planck's law in October of that year and presented it in December. Planck's original intent was to find a satisfactory derivation of Wien's expression for the blackbody radiation curve, which accurately described the data at high frequencies. Planck found Wien's original derivation inadequate and devised his own. Then, after learning that the most recent experimental results disagreed with his predictions for low frequencies, Planck revised his calculation, obtaining what is now called Planck's law.

== Comparison to Planck's law ==
In 1900 Max Planck empirically obtained an expression for black-body radiation expressed in terms of wavelength λ = c/ν (Planck's law):
$$B_\lambda(T) = \frac{2hc^2}{\lambda^5} \frac{1}{e^\frac{hc}{\lambda k_\text{B} T} - 1},$$
where h is the Planck constant, and k_{B} is the Boltzmann constant. Planck's law does not suffer from an ultraviolet catastrophe and agrees well with the experimental data, but its full significance (which ultimately led to quantum theory) was only appreciated several years later. Since
$$e^x = 1 + x + \frac{x^2}{2!} + \frac{x^3}{3!} + \cdots,$$
then in the limit of high temperatures or long wavelengths, the term in the exponential becomes small, and the exponential is well approximated with the Taylor polynomial's first-order term:
$$e^{\frac{hc}{\lambda k_\text{B} T}} \approx 1 + \frac{hc}{\lambda k_\text{B} T}.$$

So
$$\frac{1}{e^\frac{hc}{\lambda k_\text{B} T} - 1} \approx \frac{1}{\frac{hc}{\lambda k_\text{B} T}} = \frac{\lambda k_\text{B} T}{hc}.$$

This results in Planck's blackbody formula reducing to
$$B_{\lambda}(T) = \frac{2 ck_\text{B} T}{\lambda^4},$$
which is identical to the classically derived Rayleigh–Jeans expression.

The same argument can be applied to the blackbody radiation expressed in terms of frequency ν = c/λ. In the limit of small frequencies, that is $h \nu \ll k_\text{B} T$,
$$B_\nu(T) = \frac{2 h\nu^3}{c^2} \frac{1}{e^\frac{h\nu}{k_\text{B} T} - 1} \approx \frac{2 h\nu^3}{c^2} \cdot \frac{k_\text{B} T}{h\nu} = \frac{2 \nu^2 k_\mathrm{B} T}{c^2}.$$

This last expression is the Rayleigh–Jeans law in the limit of small frequencies.

== Consistency of frequency- and wavelength-dependent expressions ==
When comparing the frequency- and wavelength-dependent expressions of the Rayleigh–Jeans law, it is important to remember that
$$\frac{dP}{d\lambda} = B_{\lambda}(T)$$
and
$$\frac{dP}{d\nu} = B_{\nu}(T).$$
Note that these two expressions then have different units, as a step $d\lambda$ in wavelength is not equivalent to a step $d\nu$ in frequency. Therefore,
$$B_{\lambda}(T) \neq B_{\nu}(T),$$
even after substituting the value $\lambda = c/\nu$, because $B_\lambda(T)$ has units of energy emitted per unit time per unit area of emitting surface, per unit solid angle, per unit wavelength, whereas $B_\nu(T)$ has units of energy emitted per unit time per unit area of emitting surface, per unit solid angle, per unit frequency. To be consistent, we must use the equality
$$B_\lambda \, d\lambda = dP = B_\nu \, d\nu,$$
where both sides now have units of power (energy emitted per unit time) per unit area of emitting surface, per unit solid angle.

Starting with the Rayleigh–Jeans law in terms of wavelength, we get
$$B_\lambda(T) = B_\nu(T) \frac{d\nu}{d\lambda},$$
where
$$\frac{d\nu}{d\lambda} = \frac{d}{d\lambda} \left(\frac{c}{\lambda}\right) = -\frac{c}{\lambda^2}.$$
This leads to
$$B_\lambda(T) = \frac{2k_\text{B} T\left(\frac{c}{\lambda}\right)^2}{c^2} \times \frac{c}{\lambda^2} = \frac{2ck_\text{B} T}{\lambda^4}.$$

== Other forms of Rayleigh–Jeans law ==
Depending on the application, the Planck function can be expressed in 3 different forms. The first involves energy emitted per unit time per unit area of emitting surface, per unit solid angle, per spectral unit. In this form, the Planck function and associated Rayleigh–Jeans limits are given by
$$B_\lambda(T) = \frac{2 hc^2}{\lambda^5} \frac{1}{e^\frac{hc}{\lambda k_\text{B} T} - 1} \approx \frac{2ck_\text{B} T}{\lambda^4}$$
or
$$B_\nu(T) = \frac{2h\nu^3}{c^2} \frac{1}{e^\frac{h\nu}{k_\text{B} T} - 1} \approx \frac{2k_\text{B} T\nu^2}{c^2}.$$

Alternatively, Planck's law can be written as an expression $I(\nu, T) = \pi B_\nu(T)$ for emitted power integrated over all solid angles. In this form, the Planck function and associated Rayleigh–Jeans limits are given by
$$I(\lambda, T) = \frac{2\pi hc^2}{\lambda^5} \frac{1}{e^\frac{hc}{\lambda k_\text{B} T} - 1} \approx \frac{2\pi ck_\text{B} T}{\lambda^4}$$
or
$$I(\nu, T) = \frac{2\pi h\nu^3}{c^2} \frac{1}{e^\frac{h\nu}{k_\text{B} T} - 1} \approx \frac{2 \pi k_\text{B} T\nu^2}{c^2}.$$

In other cases, Planck's law is written as $u(\nu, T) = \frac{4\pi}{c} B_\nu(T)$ for energy per unit volume (energy density). In this form, the Planck function and associated Rayleigh–Jeans limits are given by
$$u(\lambda, T) = \frac{8 \pi hc}{\lambda^5} \frac{1}{e^\frac{hc}{\lambda k_\text{B} T} - 1} \approx \frac{8\pi k_\text{B} T}{\lambda^4}$$
or
$$u(\nu, T) = \frac{8\pi h\nu^3}{c^3} \frac{1}{e^\frac{h\nu}{k_\text{B} T} - 1} \approx \frac{8 \pi k_\text{B} T\nu^2}{c^3}.$$

== See also ==
- Stefan–Boltzmann law
- Wien's displacement law
- Wien approximation
- Sakuma–Hattori equation
