= Classical physics =

Category of theories

Impact of relativity and quantum mechanics on classical mechanics

Classical physics consists of scientific theories in the field of physics that are non-quantum or both non-quantum and non-relativistic, depending on the context. In historical discussions, classical physics refers to pre-1900 physics, while modern physics refers to post-1900 physics, which incorporates elements of quantum mechanics and the theory of relativity. However, relativity is based on classical field theory rather than quantum field theory, and is often categorized as a part of "classical physics".

== Overview ==
Classical theory has at least two distinct meanings in physics. It can include all those areas of physics that do not make use of quantum mechanics, which includes classical mechanics (using any of the Newtonian, Lagrangian, or Hamiltonian formulations), as well as classical electrodynamics and relativity. Alternatively, the term can refer to theories that are neither quantum or relativistic.

Depending on point of view, among the branches of theory sometimes included in classical physics are:

- Classical mechanics
  - Newton's laws of motion
  - Classical Lagrangian and Hamiltonian formalisms
- Classical electrodynamics (Maxwell's equations)
- Classical thermodynamics

== Comparison with modern physics ==
In contrast to classical physics, "modern physics" is usually used to focus on those revolutionary changes created by quantum physics and the theory of relativity.

A physical system can be described by classical physics when it satisfies conditions such that the laws of classical physics are approximately valid.

In practice, physical objects ranging from those larger than atoms and molecules to macroscopic and astronomical objects, can be well-described (understood) with classical mechanics. Beginning at the atomic level and lower, the laws of classical physics break down and generally do not provide a correct description of nature. Electromagnetic fields and forces can be described well by classical electrodynamics at length scales and field strengths large enough that quantum mechanical effects are negligible. Unlike quantum physics, classical physics is generally characterized by the principle of complete determinism, although deterministic interpretations of quantum mechanics do exist.

From the point of view of classical physics as being non-relativistic physics, the predictions of general and special relativity are significantly different from those of classical theories, particularly concerning the passage of time, the geometry of space, the motion of bodies in free fall, and the propagation of light. Historically, light was reconciled with classical mechanics by assuming the existence of a stationary medium through which light propagated, the luminiferous aether, which was later shown not to exist.

== Comparison to quantum physics ==
Decoherence describes how the laws of quantum physics give rise to classical physics through loss of interference.

== See also ==
- Glossary of classical physics
- Semiclassical physics
