= Radiation constant =

Radiation constant may refer to:

- The first and second radiation constants c_{1} and c_{2} – see Planck's Law
- The radiation density constant a – see Stefan–Boltzmann constant
