= Oscillator strength =

Dimensionless quantity in spectroscopy

In spectroscopy, oscillator strength is a dimensionless quantity that expresses the probability of absorption or emission of electromagnetic radiation in transitions between energy levels of an atom or molecule. For example, if an emissive state has a small oscillator strength, nonradiative decay will outpace radiative decay. Conversely, "bright" transitions will have large oscillator strengths. The oscillator strength can be thought of as the ratio between the quantum mechanical transition rate and the classical absorption/emission rate of a single electron oscillator with the same frequency as the transition.

== Theory ==
An atom or a molecule can absorb light and undergo a transition from one quantum state to another.

The oscillator strength $f_{12}$ of a transition from a lower state $|1\rangle$ to an upper state $|2\rangle$ may be defined by

$$f_{12} = \frac{2 }{3}\frac{m_e}{\hbar^2}(E_2 - E_1) \sum_{\alpha=x,y,z}
| \langle 1 m_1 | R_\alpha | 2 m_2 \rangle |^2,$$

where $m_e$ is the mass of an electron and $\hbar$ is the reduced Planck constant. The quantum states $|n\rangle, n=$ 1,2, are assumed to have several degenerate sub-states, which are labeled by $m_n$. "Degenerate" means that they all have the same energy $E_n$. The operator $R_x$ is the sum of the x-coordinates $r_{i,x}$ of all $N$ electrons in the system, i.e.

$$R_\alpha = \sum_{i=1}^N r_{i,\alpha}.$$

The oscillator strength is the same for each sub-state $|n m_n\rangle$.

The definition can be recast by inserting the Rydberg energy $\text{Ry}$ and Bohr radius $a_0$

$$f_{12} = \frac{E_2 - E_1}{3\, \text{Ry}} \frac{\sum_{\alpha=x,y,z}
| \langle 1 m_1 | R_\alpha | 2 m_2 \rangle |^2}{a_0^2}.$$

In case the matrix elements of $R_x, R_y, R_z$ are the same, we can get rid of the sum and of the 1/3 factor

$$f_{12} = 2\frac{m_e}{\hbar^2}(E_2 - E_1) \, | \langle 1 m_1 | R_x | 2 m_2 \rangle |^2.$$

== Thomas–Reiche–Kuhn sum rule ==
To make equations of the previous section applicable to the states belonging to the continuum spectrum, they should be rewritten in terms of matrix elements of the momentum $\boldsymbol{p}$. In absence of magnetic field, the Hamiltonian can be written as $H=\frac{1}{2m}\boldsymbol{p}^2+V(\boldsymbol{r})$, and calculating a commutator $[H,x]$ in the basis of eigenfunctions of $H$ results in the relation between matrix elements

$$x_{nk}=-\frac{i\hbar/m}{E_n-E_k}(p_x)_{nk}.$$.

Next, calculating matrix elements of a commutator $[p_x,x]$ in the same basis and eliminating matrix elements of $x$, we arrive at

$$\langle n|[p_x,x]|n\rangle=\frac{2i\hbar}{m}\sum_{k\neq n} \frac{|\langle n|p_x|k\rangle|^2}{E_n-E_k}.$$

Because $[p_x,x]=-i\hbar$, the above expression results in a sum rule

$$\sum_{k\neq n}f_{nk}=1,\,\,\,\,\,f_{nk}=-\frac{2}{m}\frac{|\langle n|p_x|k\rangle|^2}{E_n-E_k},$$

where $f_{nk}$ are oscillator strengths for quantum transitions between the states $n$ and $k$. This is the Thomas-Reiche-Kuhn sum rule, and the term with $k=n$ has been omitted because in confined systems such as atoms or molecules the diagonal matrix element $\langle n|p_x|n\rangle=0$ due to the time inversion symmetry of the Hamiltonian $H$. Excluding this term eliminates divergency because of the vanishing denominator.

== Sum rule and electron effective mass in crystals ==
In crystals, the electronic energy spectrum has a band structure $E_n(\boldsymbol{p})$. Near the minimum of an isotropic energy band, electron energy can be expanded in powers of $\boldsymbol{p}$ as $E_n(\boldsymbol{p})=\boldsymbol{p}^2/2m^*$ where $m^*$ is the electron effective mass. It can be shown that it satisfies the equation

$$\frac{2}{m}\sum_{k\neq n}\frac{|\langle n|p_x|k\rangle|^2}{E_k-E_n}+\frac{m}{m^*}=1.$$

Here the sum runs over all bands with $k\neq n$. Therefore, the ratio $m/m^*$ of the free electron mass $m$ to its effective mass $m^*$ in a crystal can be considered as the oscillator strength for the transition of an electron from the quantum state at the bottom of the $n$ band into the same state.

== See also ==
- Atomic spectral line
- Sum rule in quantum mechanics
- Electronic band structure
- Einstein coefficients
