= Unfolding =

Unfolding may refer to:

== Mathematics ==
- Unfolding (functions), of a manifold
- Unfolding (geometry), of a polyhedron
- Deconvolution

== Other uses ==
- Unfolding (DSP implementation)
- Unfolding (music), in Schenkerian analysis
- Unfolding (sculpture), by Bernhard Heiliger located near Milwaukee, Wisconsin, United States
- Equilibrium unfolding, in biochemistry

== See also ==
- Unfold (disambiguation)
- Unfoldment (disambiguation)
