= List of things named after Max Planck =

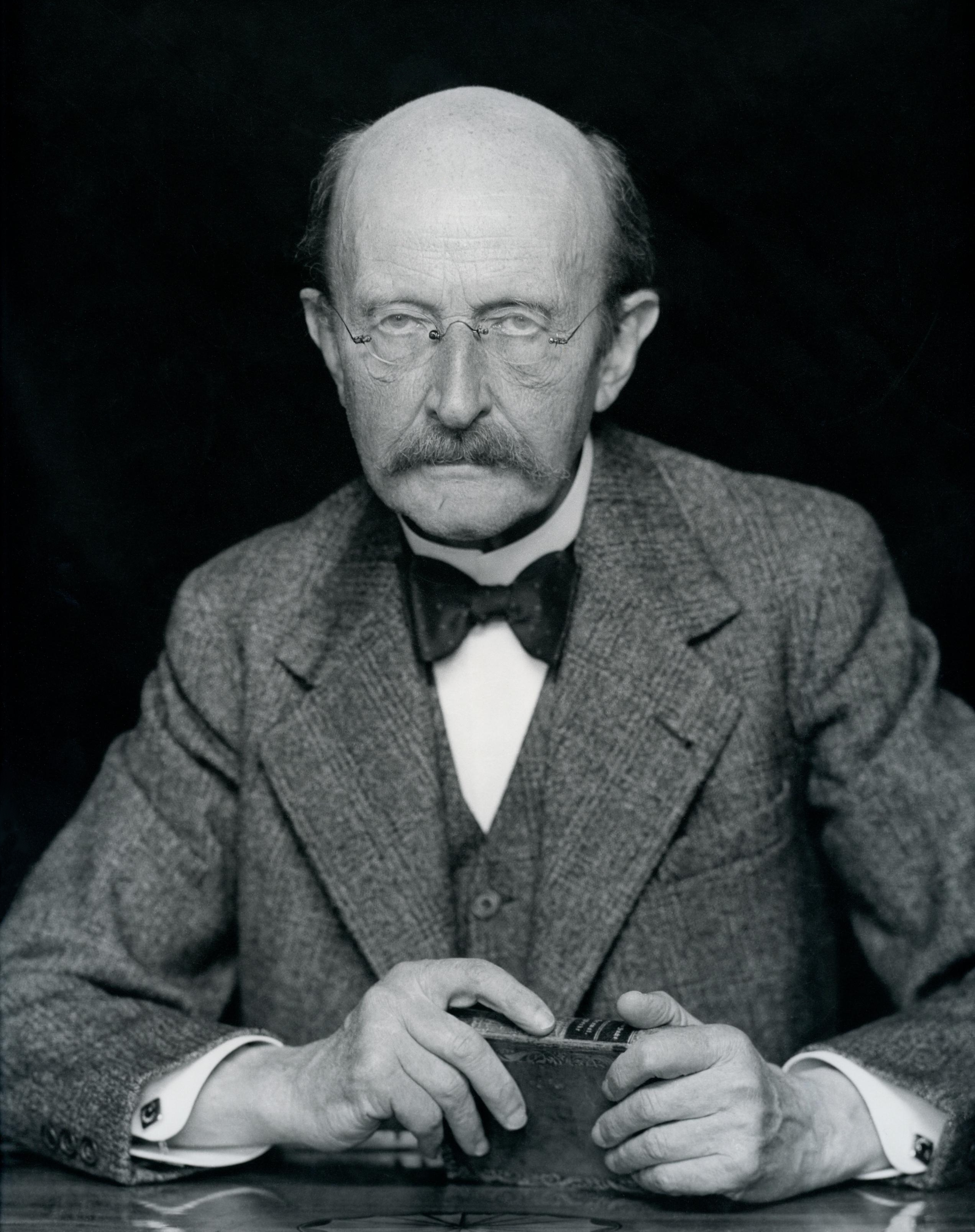
Max Planck, 1938

This is a list of things named for the German scientist Max Planck:

== Physics ==
- Boltzmann–Planck equation
- Fokker–Planck equation
- Nernst–Planck equation
- Kelvin–Planck statement of the second law of thermodynamics
- Massieu–Planck potentials
- Planck potential
- Planck proposition, Planck statement, Planck's principle; see Kelvin–Planck statement
- Planckian locus

=== Quantum mechanics ===
- Planck constant
- Planck postulate
- Planck's law of black body radiation
  - Planck-taper window
  - Planck–Bessel window
- Planck–Einstein relation

=== Cosmology ===
- Planck units
  - Planck energy
  - Planck length
  - Planck mass
  - Planck time
  - Planck temperature
- Planck epoch
- Planck postulate
- Planck scale
- Planck star
- Trans-Planckian problem

== Other ==
- 1069 Planckia, asteroid
- Max Planck Society
- Planck's principle
- Planck (crater) on the Moon
- Planck (spacecraft), space observatory
- Max-Planck-Gesellschaft, see Max Planck Society
- Colegio Max Planck, in Trujillo, Peru.
