= Vegetative Sculpture I =

Public art work by Bernhard Heiliger

Coordinates: 43.1771°N 87.9365°W

- Artist: Bernhard Heiliger
- Year: 1959
- Type: bronze and fiberglass
- Location: Lynden Sculpture Garden; Milwaukee, Wisconsin
- Owner: Bradley Family Foundation

Vegetative Sculpture I is a public art work by artist Bernhard Heiliger located at the Lynden Sculpture Garden near Milwaukee, Wisconsin. The sculpture has an abstract form; it is installed on the patio.

== See also ==
- Unfolding
