= Einstein relation =

Einstein relation can refer to:

- Einstein relation (kinetic theory), a kinetic relation found independently by Albert Einstein (1905) and Marian Smoluchowski (1906)
- Mass–energy equivalence, sometimes called Einstein's mass-energy relation
- Planck–Einstein relation, which relates the energy of a photon to its frequency
