= Max Planck =

German physicist (1858–1947)

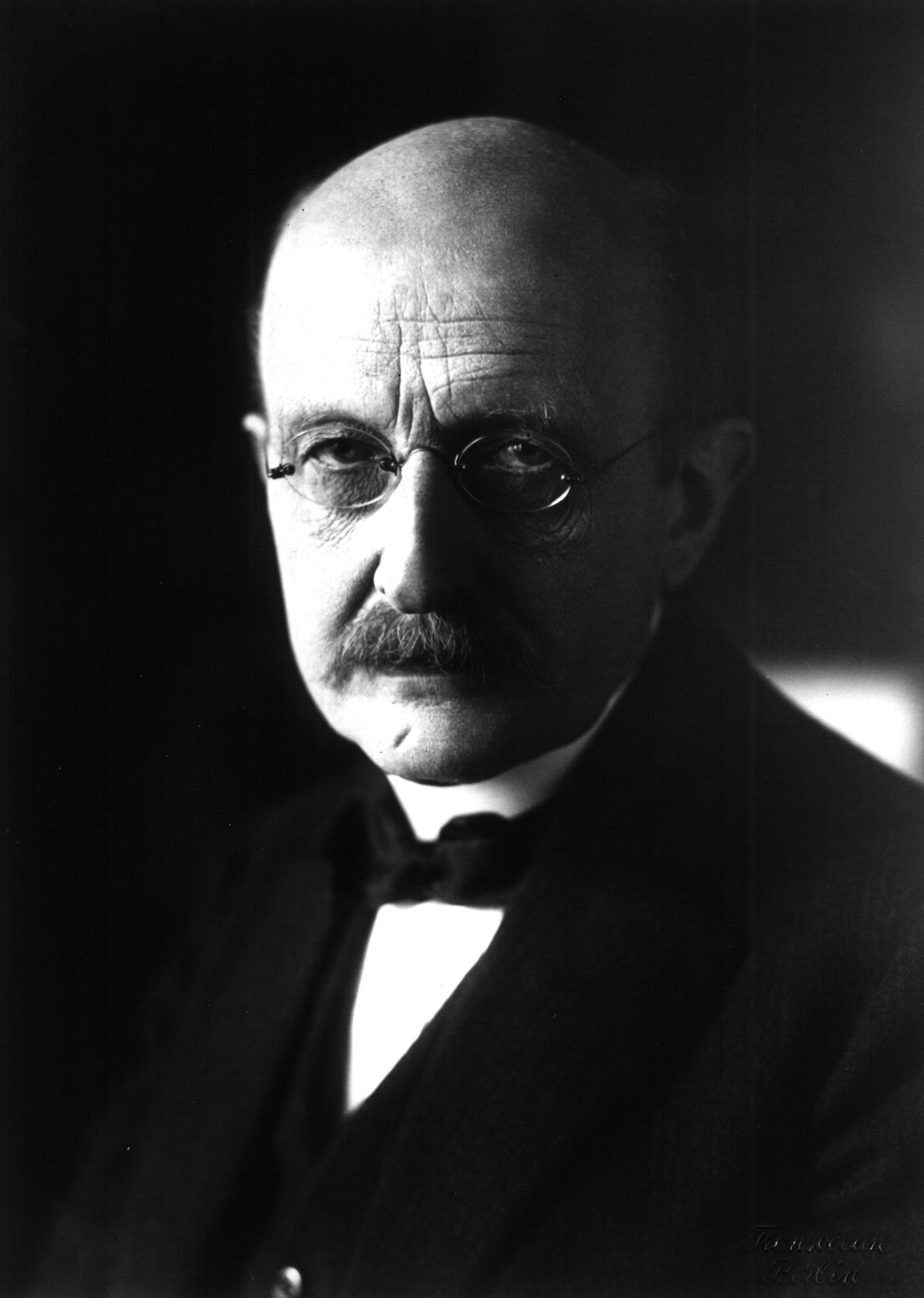
- Planck c. 1930
- Born: Max Karl Ernst Ludwig Planck; 23 April 1858; Kiel, Duchy of Holstein
- Died: 4 October 1947 (aged 89); Göttingen, Germany
- Resting place: Stadtfriedhof, Göttingen
- Education: LMU Munich (PhD, DSc); University of Berlin
- Known for: Originator of old quantum theory; Planck constant; Planck's law; Planck postulate; Planck units; See full list
- Spouses: Marie Merck (m. 1887; died 1909) Marga von Hösslin (m. 1911)
- Children: 5, including Erwin
- Awards: Nobel Prize in Physics (1918); Franklin Medal (1927); Lorentz Medal (1927); Copley Medal (1929); Max Planck Medal (1929); Goethe Prize (1945)
- Scientific career
- Fields: Physics
- Workplaces: LMU Munich; Kiel University; University of Berlin
- Thesis: Über den zweiten Hauptsatz der mechanischen Wärmetheorie (1879)
- Doctoral advisor: Alexander von Brill
- Other academic advisors: Hermann von Helmholtz; Philipp von Jolly; Gustav Kirchhoff; Karl Weierstrass
- Doctoral students: See list: Max Abraham; Walther Bothe; Hans von Euler-Chelpin; Hartmut Kallmann; Wolfgang Köhler; Erich Kretschmann; Max von Laue; Walther Meissner; Kurd von Mosengeil; Moritz Schlick; Walter Schottky; Erich Schumann
- Other notable students: See list: Richard Becker; George Ellery Hale; Gustav Ludwig Hertz; Elizabeth Laird; Lise Meitner; Ernest Merritt; Eugene Wigner; Ernst Zermelo

Max Karl Ernst Ludwig Planck (/plɑːŋk/, UK also /plæŋk/; German: [ˈmaks ˈplaŋk]; 23 April 1858 – 4 October 1947) was a German theoretical physicist. Planck made many contributions to theoretical physics, primarily in his role as the originator of quantum theory and one of the founders of modern physics, which revolutionized understanding of atomic and subatomic processes. He is known for the Planck constant, $h$, which is of foundational importance for quantum physics, and which he used to derive a set of units, now called Planck units, expressed in terms of physical constants. The Planck relation, $E = h \nu$, states that the energy of a photon is proportional to its frequency.

Planck was twice President of the Kaiser Wilhelm Society. In 1948 it was renamed the Max Planck Society in his honor, and today includes 83 institutions representing a wide range of scientific disciplines. He was awarded the 1918 Nobel Prize in Physics "for the services he rendered to the advancement of physics by his discovery of energy quanta".

== Early life and education ==
Max Karl Ernst Ludwig Planck was born on 23 April 1858 in Kiel, the son of Johann Julius Wilhelm Planck and his second wife, Emma Patzig. He was baptized with the name of Karl Ernst Ludwig Marx Planck; of his given names, Marx was indicated as the "appellation name". However, by the age of ten he had begun signing with the name Max and used this for the rest of his life.

Planck came from a traditional, intellectual family. His paternal great-grandfather and grandfather were both theology professors at the University of Göttingen; his father was a law professor at Kiel University and the Ludwig-Maximilians-Universität München. One of his uncles was also a judge.

Planck was the sixth child in the family, though two of his siblings were from his father's first marriage. War was common during Planck's early years and among his earliest memories was the marching of Prussian and Austrian troops into Kiel during the Second Schleswig War in 1864.

In 1867, the family moved to Munich, where Planck enrolled at Maximiliansgymnasium. There, his mathematical talents emerged early and he later came under the tutelage of Hermann Müller, a mathematician who took an interest in the youth, and taught him astronomy and mechanics as well as mathematics. It was from Müller that Planck first learned the law of conservation of energy. This is how Planck first came in contact with the field of physics. Planck graduated early, at age 17.

Planck was gifted in music; he took singing lessons and played piano, organ and cello, and composed songs and operas. Per Encyclopædia Britannica, "He possessed the gift of absolute pitch and was an excellent pianist who daily found serenity and delight at the keyboard, enjoying especially the works of Schubert and Brahms."

In 1874, Planck enrolled at the Ludwig-Maximilians-Universität München. Under professor Philipp von Jolly's supervision, Planck performed the only experiments of his scientific career, studying the diffusion of hydrogen through heated platinum, but then transferred to theoretical physics. Jolly advised Planck against going into theoretical physics; Planck recalls that in 1878, Jolly argued that physics was almost complete, being a "highly developed, nearly fully matured science, that through the crowning achievement of the discovery of the principle of conservation of energy will arguably soon take its final stable form".

In 1877, Planck went to the Friedrich Wilhelm University of Berlin for a year of study with physicists Hermann von Helmholtz and Gustav Kirchhoff and mathematician Karl Weierstrass. He wrote that Helmholtz was never quite prepared, spoke slowly, miscalculated endlessly, and bored his listeners, while Kirchhoff spoke in carefully prepared lectures which were dry and monotonous. He soon became a close friend with Helmholtz. While there he undertook a program of mostly self-study of Rudolf Clausius' writings, which led him to choose thermodynamics as his field.

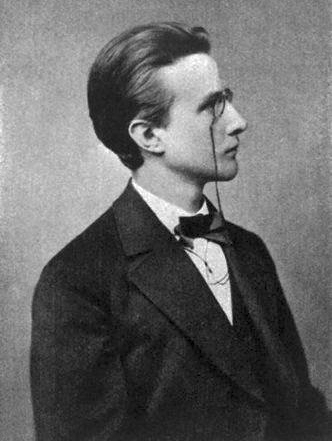
Planck in 1878

In October 1878, Planck passed his qualifying exams and in February 1879 defended his thesis Über den zweiten Hauptsatz der mechanischen Wärmetheorie (On the second law of mechanical heat theory). He briefly taught mathematics and physics at his former school in Munich.

By the year 1880, Planck had obtained the two highest academic degrees offered in Europe. The first was a doctoral degree after he completed his paper detailing his research and theory of thermodynamics. He then presented his habilitation thesis titled Über Gleichgewichtszustände isotroper Körper in verschiedenen Temperaturen (On the equilibrium states of isotropic bodies at different temperatures).

== Career and research ==
In 1880, Planck became a Privatdozent (unsalaried lecturer) at the Ludwig-Maximilians-Universität München, waiting until he was offered an academic position. Although he was initially ignored by the academic community, he furthered his work on the field of heat theory and discovered one after another the same thermodynamical formalism as Gibbs without realizing it. Clausius' ideas on entropy occupied a central role in his work.

In April 1885, Planck was appointed associate professor of Theoretical Physics at Kiel University. Further work on entropy and its treatment, especially as applied in physical chemistry, followed. He published his Treatise on Thermodynamics in 1897. He proposed a thermodynamic basis for Svante Arrhenius's theory of electrolytic dissociation.

In 1889, Planck was named the successor to Kirchhoff's position at the Friedrich Wilhelm University of Berlin – presumably thanks to Helmholtz's intercession – and by 1892 became Full Professor. In 1907, he was offered Ludwig Boltzmann's position in Vienna, but turned it down to stay in Berlin. During 1909, as a professor at the Friedrich Wilhelm University of Berlin, he was invited to become the Ernest Kempton Adams Lecturer in Theoretical Physics at Columbia University in New York City. A series of his lectures were translated and co-published by Columbia University professor A. P. Wills. He retired from Berlin on 10 January 1926, and was succeeded by Erwin Schrödinger.

=== Professor at the Friedrich Wilhelm University of Berlin ===
As a professor at the Friedrich Wilhelm University of Berlin, Planck joined the local Physical Society. He later wrote about this time: "In those days I was essentially the only theoretical physicist there, whence things were not so easy for me, because I started mentioning entropy, but this was not quite fashionable, since it was regarded as a mathematical spook". Thanks to his initiative, the various local Physical Societies of Germany merged in 1898 to form the German Physical Society (Deutsche Physikalische Gesellschaft, DPG); from 1905 to 1909 Planck was the president.

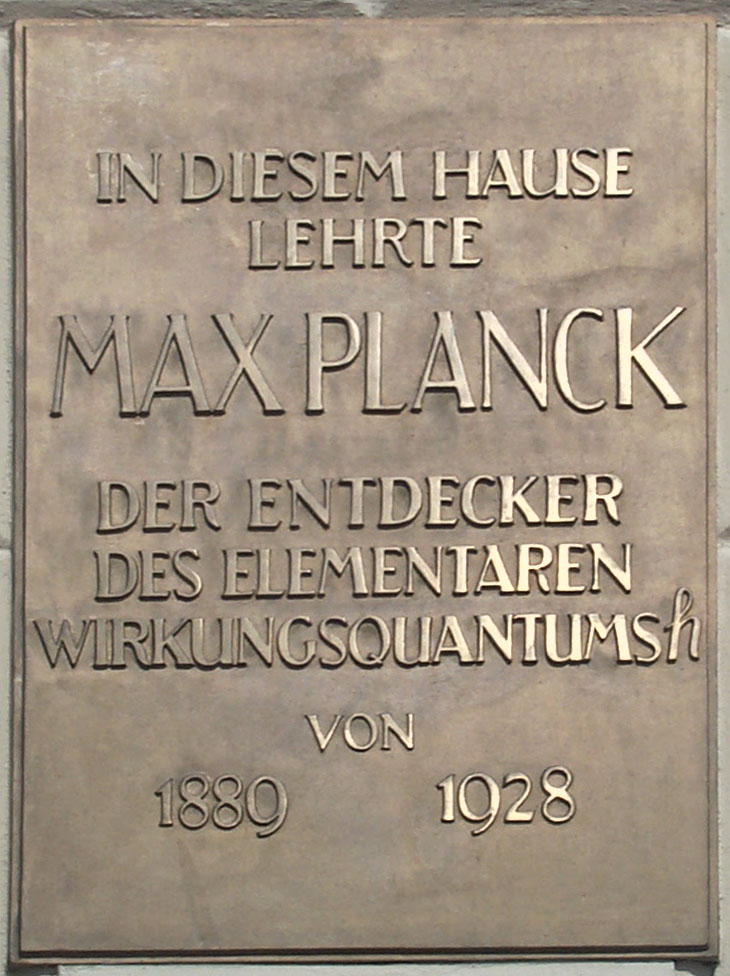
Plaque at the Humboldt University of Berlin: "Max Planck, discoverer of the elementary quantum of action h, taught in this building from 1889 to 1928."

Planck started a six-semester course of lectures on theoretical physics, "dry, somewhat impersonal" according to Lise Meitner, "using no notes, never making mistakes, never faltering; the best lecturer I ever heard" according to an English participant, James R. Partington, who continues: "There were always many standing around the room. As the lecture-room was well heated and rather close, some of the listeners would from time to time drop to the floor, but this did not disturb the lecture." Planck did not establish an actual "school"; the number of his graduate students was only about 20, among them:

- 1897 Max Abraham (1875–1922)
- 1903 Max von Laue (1879–1960)
- 1904 Moritz Schlick (1882–1936)
- 1906 Walther Meissner (1882–1974)
- 1907 Fritz Reiche (1883–1960)
- 1912 Walter Schottky (1886–1976)
- 1914 Walther Bothe (1891–1957)

=== Entropy ===
Thermodynamics, also known as the "mechanical theory of heat" at the end of the 19th century, had emerged at the beginning of this century from an attempt to understand the functioning of steam engines and to improve their efficiency. In the 1840s, several researchers independently discovered and formulated the law of conservation of energy, which is now also known as the first law of thermodynamics. In 1850, Rudolf Clausius formulated the so-called second law of thermodynamics, which states that a voluntary (or spontaneous) transfer of energy is only possible from a warmer to a colder body, but not vice versa. In England at this time William Thomson came to the same conclusion.

Clausius generalized his formulation further and further and came up with a new formulation in 1865. To this end, he introduced the concept of entropy, which he defined as a measure of the reversible supply of heat in relation to the absolute temperature.

The new formulation of the second law, which is still valid today, was: "Entropy can be created, but never destroyed". Clausius, whose work Planck read as a young student during his stay in Berlin, successfully applied this new law of nature to mechanical, thermoelectric and chemical processes.

In his thesis in 1879, Planck summarized Clausius' writings, pointing out contradictions and inaccuracies in their formulation and then clarifying them. In addition, he generalized the validity of the second law to all processes in nature; Clausius had limited its application to reversible processes and thermal processes. Furthermore, Planck dealt intensively with the new concept of entropy and emphasized that entropy is not only a property of a physical system, but at the same time a measure of the irreversibility of a process: If entropy is generated in a process, it is irreversible, since entropy cannot be destroyed according to the second law. In reversible processes, the entropy remains constant. He presented this fact in detail in 1887 in a series of treatises entitled "On the Principle of the Increase of Entropy".

In his study of the concept of entropy, Planck did not follow the molecular, probabilistic interpretation that prevailed at the time, as these do not provide absolute proof of universality. Instead, he pursued a phenomenological approach and was also skeptical of atomism. Even though he later abandoned this attitude in the course of his work on the law of radiation, his early work impressively shows the possibilities of thermodynamics in solving concrete physicochemical problems.

Planck's understanding of entropy included the realization that the maximum of entropy corresponds to the equilibrium state. The accompanying conclusion that knowledge of the Entropy allows all laws of thermodynamic equilibrium states to be derived corresponds to the modern understanding of such states. Planck therefore chose equilibrium processes as his research focus and, based on his habilitation thesis, researched the coexistence of aggregate states and the equilibrium of gas reactions, for example. This work on the frontier of chemical thermodynamics also received great attention due to the rapidly expanding chemical work at that time.

Independently of Planck, Josiah Willard Gibbs had also discovered almost all the knowledge Planck gained about the properties of physicochemical equilibria and published them from 1876 onwards. Planck was unaware of these essays, and they did not appear in German until 1892. However, both scientists approached the topic in different ways, while Planck dealt with irreversible processes, Gibbs looked at equilibria. This approach was finally able to prevail because of its simplicity, but Planck's approach is attributed the greater universality.

=== Electrolytes and Solutions ===
In addition to his research on entropy, Planck dedicated the first decade of his scientific career to the study of electrical processes in solutions. During this period, he succeeded in theoretically deriving the relationship between the conductivity and dilution of a solution, thereby establishing the foundations of modern electrolyte theory. He was also able to provide a theoretical derivation for the conditions governing the changes in freezing and boiling points of dilute solutions, phenomena which had been empirically discovered by François-Marie Raoult and Jacobus Henricus van ’t Hoff in 1886.

=== Black-body radiation ===
In 1894, Planck turned his attention to the problem of black-body radiation. The problem had been stated by Kirchhoff in 1859: "how does the intensity of the electromagnetic radiation emitted by a black body (a perfect absorber, also known as a cavity radiator) depend on the frequency of the radiation (i.e., the color of the light) and the temperature of the body?". The question had been explored experimentally, but no theoretical treatment had agreed with the experimentally observed evidence. Wilhelm Wien proposed Wien's law, which correctly predicted the behaviour at high frequencies, but failed at low frequencies. The Rayleigh–Jeans law, another approach to the problem, agreed with experimental results at low frequencies, but created what was later known as the "ultraviolet catastrophe" at high frequencies, as predicted by classical physics. However, contrary to many textbooks, this was not a motivation for Planck.

Planck's first proposed solution to the problem in 1899 followed from what he called the "principle of elementary disorder", which allowed him to derive Wien's law from a number of assumptions about the entropy of an ideal oscillator, creating what was referred to as the Wien–Planck law. Soon, however, it was found that experimental evidence did not confirm the new law at all, to Planck's frustration. He revised his approach and now derived the first version of the famous Planck black-body radiation law, which described clearly the experimentally observed black-body spectrum. It was first proposed in a meeting of the DPG on 19 October 1900 and published in 1901. (This first derivation did not include energy quantisation, and did not use statistical mechanics, to which he held an aversion.) In November 1900 Planck revised this first version, now relying on Boltzmann's statistical interpretation of the second law of thermodynamics as a way of gaining a more fundamental understanding of the principles behind his radiation law. Planck was deeply suspicious of the philosophical and physical implications of such an interpretation of Boltzmann's approach; thus his recourse to them was, as he later put it, "an act of despair ... I was ready to sacrifice any of my previous convictions about physics".

The central assumption behind his new derivation, presented to the DPG on 14 December 1900, was the supposition, now known as the Planck postulate, that electromagnetic energy could be emitted only in quantized form, in other words, the energy could only be a multiple of an elementary unit:

$$E = h\nu$$

where h is the Planck constant, also known as Planck's action quantum (introduced already in 1899), and ν is the frequency of the radiation. Note that the elementary units of energy discussed here are represented by hν and not simply by ν. Physicists now call these quanta photons, and a photon of frequency ν will have its own specific and unique energy. The total energy at that frequency is then equal to hν multiplied by the number of photons at that frequency. He explained: "Radiant heat is not a continuous flow and indefinitely divisible. ... It must be defined as a discontinuous mass, made up of units all of which are similar to one another." He called quanta "the pennies of the atomic world."

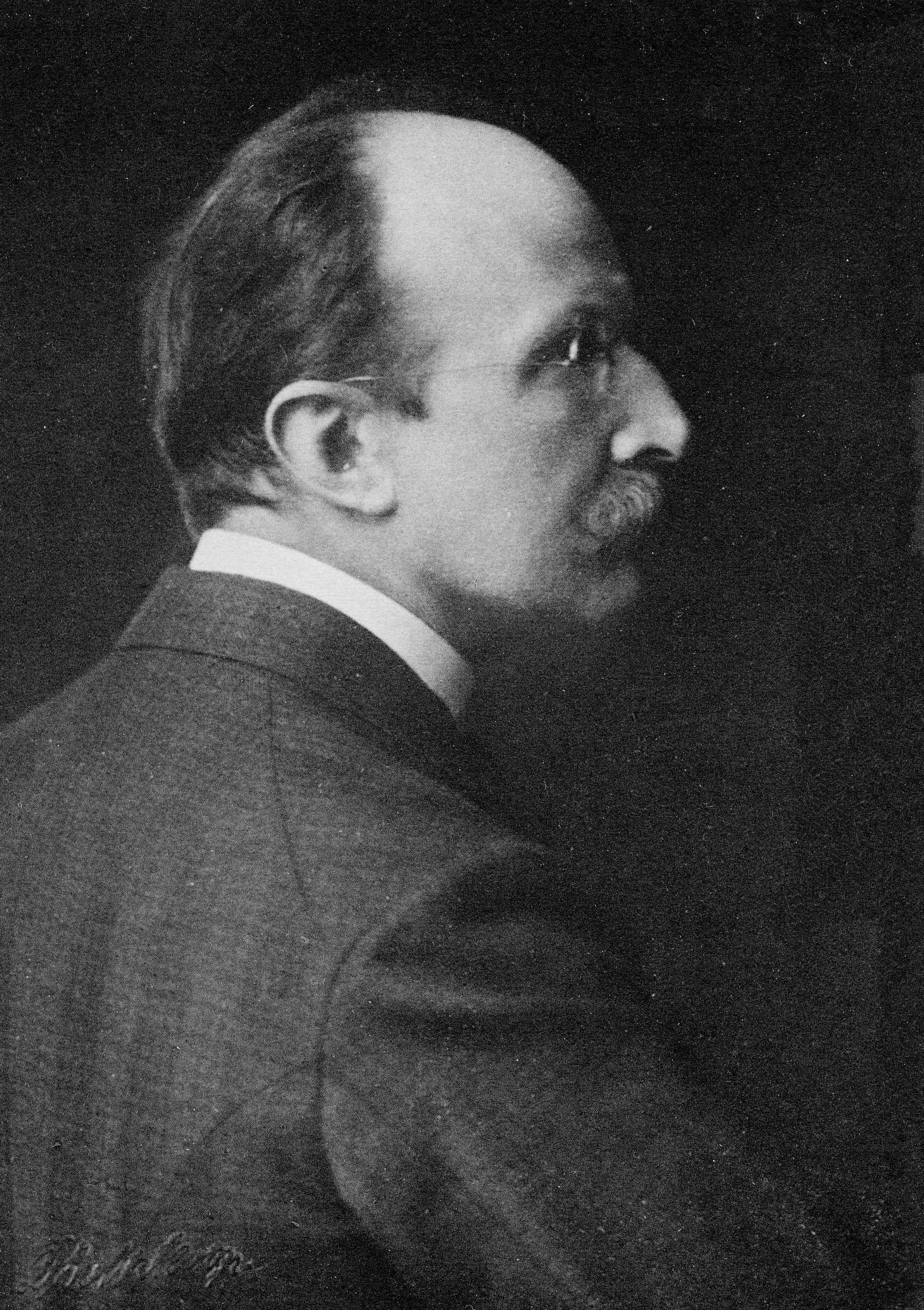
Planck in 1918, the year he was awarded the Nobel Prize in Physics for his work on quantum theory.

At first Planck considered that quantisation was only "a purely formal assumption ... actually I did not think much about it ..."; nowadays this assumption, incompatible with classical physics, is regarded as the birth of quantum physics and the greatest intellectual accomplishment of Planck's career. (Boltzmann had been discussing in a theoretical paper in 1877 the possibility that the energy states of a physical system could be discrete). The discovery of the Planck constant enabled him to define a new universal set of physical units (such as the Planck length and the Planck mass), all based on fundamental physical constants, upon which much of quantum theory is based. In a discussion with his son in December 1918 Planck described his discovery as 'a discovery of the first rank, comparable perhaps only to the discoveries of Newton'. In recognition of Planck's fundamental contribution to a new branch of physics, he was awarded the Nobel Prize in Physics for 1918; he received the award in 1919.

Subsequently, Planck tried to grasp the meaning of energy quanta, but to no avail. "My unavailing attempts to somehow reintegrate the action quantum into classical theory extended over several years and caused me much trouble." Even several years later, other physicists such as Rayleigh, Jeans, and Lorentz set the Planck constant to zero in order to align with classical physics, but Planck knew well that this constant had a precise nonzero value. "I am unable to understand Jeans' stubbornness – he is an example of a theoretician as should never be existing, the same as Hegel was for philosophy. So much the worse for the facts if they don't fit."

Max Born wrote about Planck: "He was, by nature, a conservative mind; he had nothing of the revolutionary and was thoroughly skeptical about speculations. Yet his belief in the compelling force of logical reasoning from facts was so strong that he did not flinch from announcing the most revolutionary idea which ever has shaken physics."

=== Einstein and the theory of relativity ===
In 1905, Albert Einstein published three papers in the journal Annalen der Physik. Planck was among the few who immediately recognized the significance of the special theory of relativity. Thanks to his influence, this theory was soon widely accepted in Germany. Planck also contributed considerably to extend the special theory of relativity. For example, he recast the theory in terms of classical action.

Einstein's hypothesis of light quanta (photons), based on Heinrich Hertz's 1887 discovery (and further investigation by Philipp Lenard) of the photoelectric effect, was initially rejected by Planck. He was unwilling to discard completely Maxwell's theory of electrodynamics. "The theory of light would be thrown back not by decades, but by centuries, into the age when Christiaan Huygens dared to fight against the mighty emission theory of Isaac Newton ..."

In 1910, Einstein pointed out the anomalous behavior of specific heat at low temperatures as another example of a phenomenon which defies explanation by classical physics. Planck and Walther Nernst, seeking to clarify the increasing number of contradictions, organized the First Solvay Conference (Brussels 1911). At this meeting Einstein was able to convince Planck.

Meanwhile, Planck had been appointed dean of the Friedrich Wilhelm University of Berlin, whereby it was possible for him to appoint Einstein to Berlin and establish a new professorship for him (1914). Soon, the two scientists became close friends and met frequently to play music together.

=== First World War ===
At the onset of the First World War Planck endorsed the general excitement of the public, writing that, "Besides much that is horrible, there is also much that is unexpectedly great and beautiful: the smooth solution of the most difficult domestic political problems by the unification of all parties (and) ... the extolling of everything good and noble." Planck also signed the infamous "Manifesto of the 93 intellectuals", a pamphlet of polemic war propaganda (while Einstein retained a strictly pacifistic attitude which almost led to his imprisonment, only being spared thanks to his Swiss citizenship).

In 1915, when Italy was still a neutral power, Planck voted successfully for a scientific paper from Italy, which received a prize from the Prussian Academy of Sciences, where Planck was one of four permanent presidents.

=== Post-war and the Weimar Republic ===
In the turbulent post-war years, Planck, now the highest authority of German physics, issued the slogan "persevere and continue working" to his colleagues.

In October 1920, he and Fritz Haber established the Notgemeinschaft der Deutschen Wissenschaft, aimed at providing financial support for scientific research. A considerable portion of the money the organization would distribute was raised abroad.

Planck held leading positions at the Friedrich Wilhelm University of Berlin, the Prussian Academy of Sciences, the German Physical Society, and the Kaiser Wilhelm Society (which became the Max Planck Society in 1948). During this time economic conditions in Germany were such that he was hardly able to conduct research.

During the interwar period, Planck became a member of the German People's Party, the party of Nobel Peace Prize laureate Gustav Stresemann, which aspired to liberal aims for domestic policy and rather revisionistic aims for politics around the world.

Planck disagreed with the introduction of universal suffrage and later expressed the view that the Nazi dictatorship resulted from "the ascent of the rule of the crowds."

=== Quantum mechanics ===
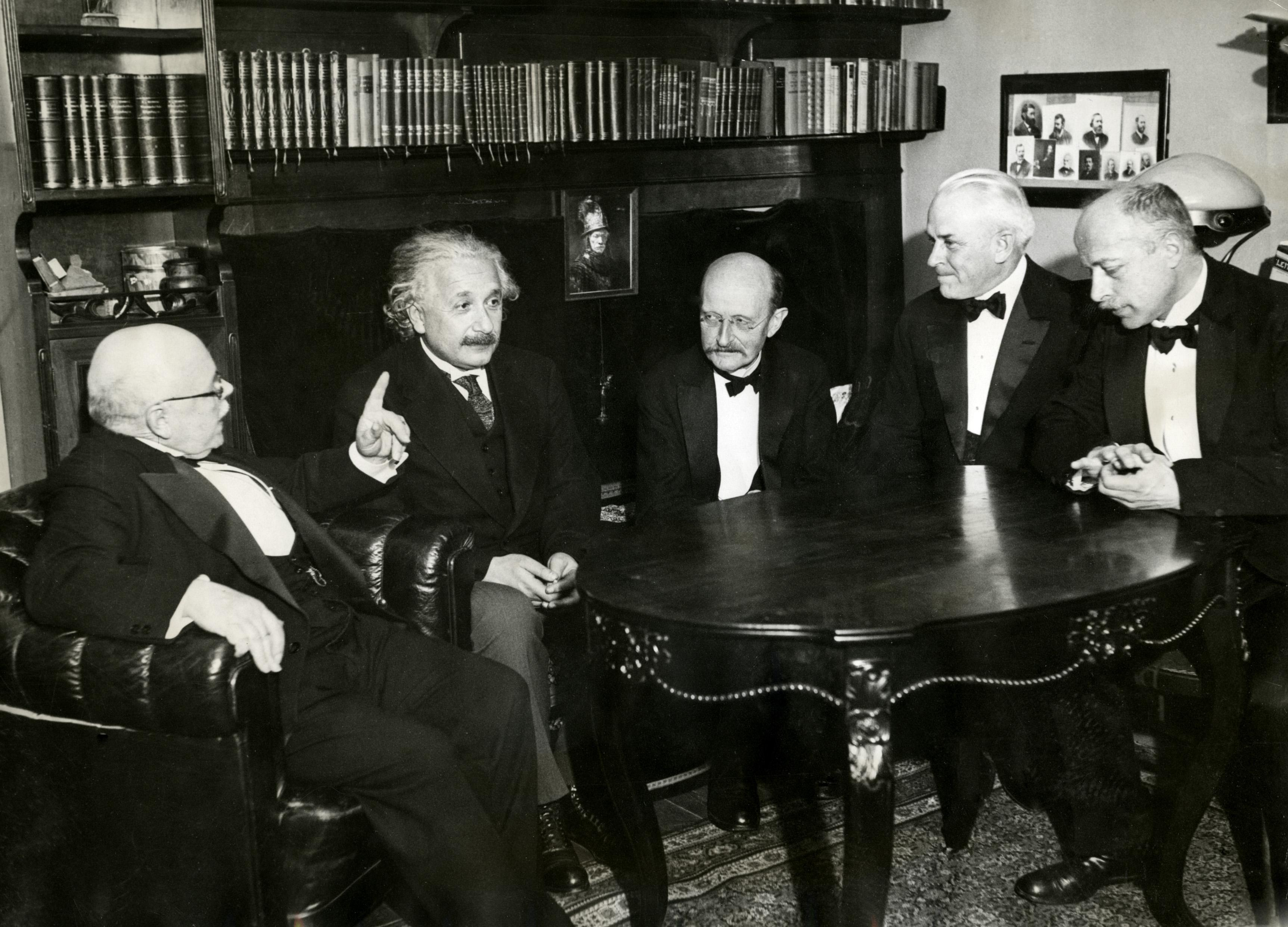
From left to right: Nernst, Einstein, Planck, Millikan, and Laue at a dinner given by Laue in Berlin on 11 November 1931.

At the end of the 1920s, Niels Bohr, Werner Heisenberg, and Wolfgang Pauli had worked out the Copenhagen interpretation of quantum mechanics, but it was rejected by Planck, and by Schrödinger, Laue, and Einstein as well. Planck expected that wave mechanics would soon render quantum theory – his own child – unnecessary. This was not to be the case, however. Further work only served to underscore the enduring central importance of quantum theory, even against his and Einstein's philosophical revulsions. Here Planck experienced the truth of his own earlier observation from his struggle with the older views during his younger years: "A new scientific truth does not triumph by convincing its opponents and making them see the light, but rather because its opponents eventually die, and a new generation grows up that is familiar with it." The quote, while often cited, had multiple counter examples by Planck's own time. It took only 10 years for 75% of British scientists to generally accept Charles Darwin's ideas from On the Origin of Species and science historian I. Bernard Cohen noted that, to the contrary, Planck's own ideas were generally accepted by his peers. Plate tectonics also took only a decade to be adopted by geologists evidenced by its use in textbooks. K. Brad Wray's research into the history of scientific ideas showed that older scientists are only marginally less inclined to accept new conceptualizations.

=== Nazi dictatorship and the Second World War ===
When the Nazis came to power in 1933, Planck was 74 years old. He witnessed many Jewish friends and colleagues expelled from their positions and humiliated, and hundreds of scientists emigrate from Nazi Germany. He again tried to "persevere and continue working" and asked scientists who were considering emigration to remain in Germany. Nevertheless, he helped his nephew, the economist Hermann Kranold, to emigrate to London after his arrest. He hoped the crisis would abate soon and the political situation would improve.

Otto Hahn asked Planck to gather well-known German professors in order to issue a public proclamation against the treatment of Jewish professors, but Planck replied, "If you are able to gather today 30 such gentlemen, then tomorrow 150 others will come and speak against it, because they are eager to take over the positions of the others." Under Planck's leadership, the Kaiser Wilhelm Society (KWG) avoided open conflict with the Nazi regime, except concerning the Jewish Fritz Haber. In May 1933, Planck requested and received an interview with the recently appointed Chancellor of Germany Adolf Hitler to discuss the issue, telling him that the "forced emigration of Jews would kill German science and Jews could be good Germans", to which the chancellor replied "but we don't have anything against the Jews, only against communists". Planck was therefore unsuccessful, since this reply "took from him every basis for further negotiation", as to Hitler "the Jews are all Communists, and these are [his] enemies." In the following year, 1934, Haber died in exile.

One year later, Planck, having been the president of the KWG since 1930, organized in a somewhat provocative style an official commemorative meeting for Haber. He also succeeded in secretly enabling a number of Jewish scientists to continue working in institutes of the KWG for several years. In 1936, his term as president of the KWG ended, and the Nazi government pressured him to refrain from seeking another term.

As the political climate in Germany gradually became more hostile, Johannes Stark, prominent exponent of the Deutsche Physik ("German Physics", also called "Aryan Physics") attacked Planck, Arnold Sommerfeld, and Heisenberg for continuing to teach the theories of Einstein, calling them "white Jews". The "Hauptamt Wissenschaft" (Nazi government office for science) started an investigation of Planck's ancestry, claiming that he was "1/16 Jewish", but Planck denied it.

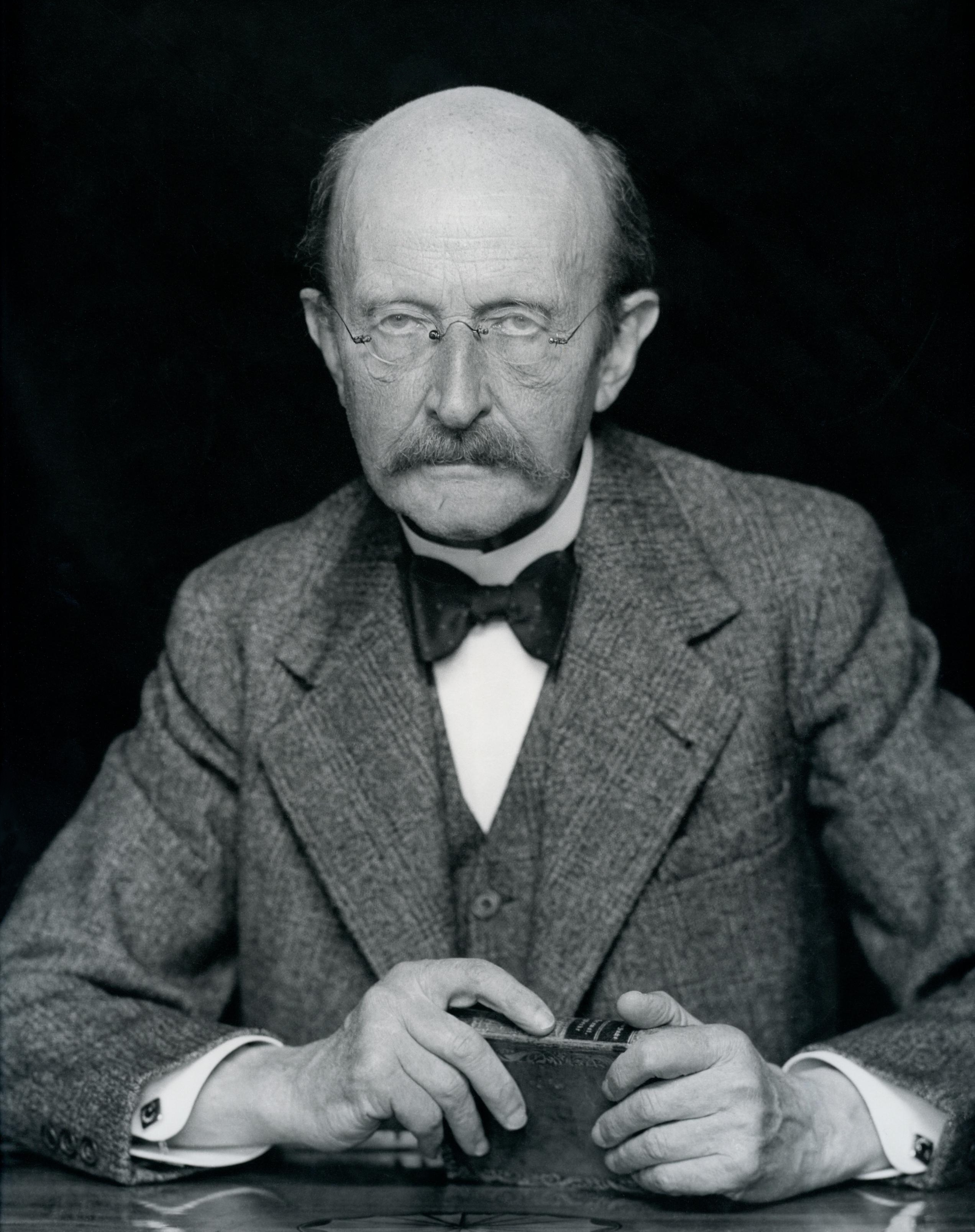
Planck in 1938

In 1938, Planck celebrated his 80th birthday. The DPG held a celebration, during which the Max-Planck medal (founded as the highest medal by the DPG in 1928) was awarded to French physicist Louis de Broglie. At the end of 1938, the Prussian Academy lost its remaining independence and was taken over by Nazis, as part of their process of Gleichschaltung. Planck protested by resigning his presidency. He continued to travel frequently, giving numerous public talks, such as his talk on Religion and Science and, five years later, he was sufficiently fit to climb 3,000-metre peaks in the Alps.

During the Second World War, the increasing number of Allied bombing missions against Berlin forced Planck and his wife to temporarily leave the city and live in the countryside. In 1942, he wrote: "In me an ardent desire has grown to persevere this crisis and live long enough to be able to witness the turning point, the beginning of a new rise." In February 1944, his home in Berlin was completely destroyed by an air raid, annihilating all his scientific records and correspondence. His rural retreat was threatened by the rapid advance of the Allied armies from both sides.

In 1944, Planck's son Erwin was arrested by the Gestapo following the attempted assassination of Hitler in the 20 July plot. He was tried and sentenced to death by the People's Court in October 1944. Erwin was hanged at Berlin's Plötzensee Prison in January 1945. The death of his son destroyed much of Planck's will to live.

== Personal life and death ==
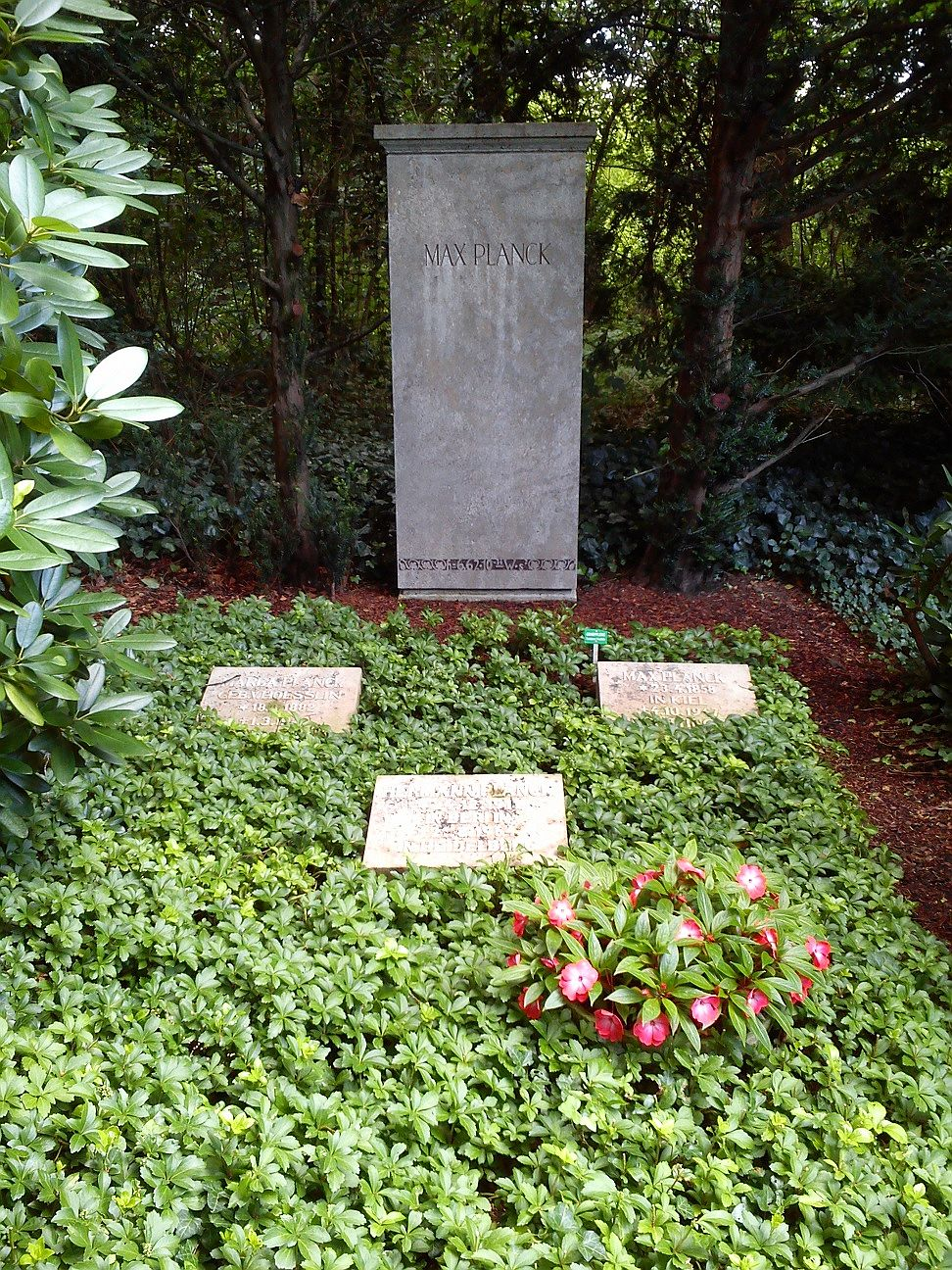
Planck's grave in the Stadtfriedhof.

In March 1887, Planck married Marie Merck (1861–1909), sister of a school fellow, and moved with her into a sublet apartment in Kiel. They had four children: Karl (1888–1916), the twins Emma (1889–1919) and Grete (1889–1917), and Erwin (1893–1945).

After living in the apartment in Berlin, the Planck family lived in a villa in Berlin-Grunewald, Wangenheimstrasse 21. Several other professors of the Friedrich Wilhelm University of Berlin lived nearby, among them theologian Adolf von Harnack, who became a close friend of Planck. Soon the Planck home became a social and cultural center. Numerous well-known scientists, such as Albert Einstein, Otto Hahn and Lise Meitner were frequent visitors. The tradition of jointly performing music had already been established in the home of Helmholtz.

Marie Planck died in October 1909, possibly of tuberculosis.

In March 1911 Planck married his second wife, Marga von Hoesslin (1882–1949); in December his fifth child, Hermann, was born.

During the First World War, Planck's second son, Erwin, was taken prisoner by the French in 1914, while his oldest son, Karl, was killed in action at Verdun. Grete died in 1917 while giving birth to her first child. Her sister died the same way two years later, after having married Grete's widower. Both granddaughters survived and were named after their mothers.

In January 1945, Erwin Planck, to whom he had been particularly close, was sentenced to death by the People's Court because of his participation in the failed attempt to assassinate Hitler in July 1944. Erwin was executed on 23 January 1945.

After World War II ended, Planck, his second wife, and their son were brought to a relative in Göttingen, where Planck died on 4 October 1947. He is buried in the Stadtfriedhof in Göttingen.

Contrary to Bohr, Planck believed the “outside world is something independent from man, something absolute, and the quest for the laws which apply to this absolute appeared…as the most sublime scientific pursuit in life.”

Einstein, in the introduction to Planck's Where Is Science Going?, called him "One of those few worshipers in the Temple of Science who would still remain should an angel of God descend and drive out of the temple all those lesser scientists, who under different circumstances might become politicians or captains of industry."

== Religious views ==
Planck was a member of the Lutheran Church in Germany. He was very tolerant toward differing religious views. In a lecture in 1937 entitled "Religion und Naturwissenschaft" ("Religion and Natural Science"), Planck discussed religious symbols as representations through which believers approach God, while cautioning against treating these symbols as identical with divine reality. He criticized both atheistic attacks on religious belief and the excessive elevation of religious symbols. Planck argued more broadly that religion and natural science were compatible, writing that they "do not exclude each other" but "mutually supplement and condition each other."

Planck said in 1944, "As a man who has devoted his whole life to the most clear headed science, to the study of matter, I can tell you as a result of my research about atoms this much: There is no matter as such. All matter originates and exists only by virtue of a force which brings the particle of an atom to vibration and holds this most minute solar system of the atom together. We must assume behind this force the existence of a conscious and intelligent spirit [orig. Geist]. This spirit is the matrix of all matter."

Planck argued that the concept of God is important to both religion and science, but in different ways: "Both religion and science require a belief in God. For believers, God is in the beginning, and for physicists He is at the end of all considerations … To the former He is the foundation, to the latter, the crown of the edifice of every generalized world view".

Furthermore, Planck wrote,

..."to believe" means "to recognize as a truth", and the knowledge of nature, continually advancing on incontestably safe tracks, has made it utterly impossible for a person possessing some training in natural science to recognize as founded on truth the many reports of extraordinary occurrences contradicting the laws of nature, of miracles which are still commonly regarded as essential supports and confirmations of religious doctrines, and which formerly used to be accepted as facts pure and simple, without doubt or criticism. The belief in miracles must retreat step by step before relentlessly and reliably progressing science and we cannot doubt that sooner or later it must vanish completely.

Noted historian of science John L. Heilbron characterized Planck's views on God as deistic. This was a scholarly characterization of Planck's theology rather than a religious identification Planck is recorded as having adopted for himself. Heilbron further relates that, late in life, Planck stated that although he had always been deeply religious, he did not believe "in a personal God, let alone a Christian God."

=== Philosophical shift to scientific realism ===
While Planck began his career as a proponent of Ernst Mach's positivism, his discovery of the quantum of action led him to embrace scientific realism. He argued that the "world-picture" of physics must be based on objective realities that exist independently of human observation.

This philosophical stance led to a famous public rift with Mach in 1908. Planck's belief in an objective, causal universe defined by "absolutes" was a major factor in his early and unwavering support for Einstein's theory of relativity. However, this same realism later made him a prominent critic of the probabilistic nature of the Copenhagen interpretation championed by Niels Bohr.

=== Musical life and absolute pitch ===
Planck was an accomplished musician who possessed absolute pitch. He was a pianist, organist, and cellist who composed the opera Die Liebe im Walde during his university years.

Throughout his life, his home in Berlin became a cultural hub where he hosted weekly musical soirées. These gatherings frequently included Albert Einstein on the violin and the renowned violinist Joseph Joachim. Planck once noted that the laws of physics and the laws of harmony both represented different paths to understanding universal absolutes.

== Recognition ==
=== Memberships ===
| Year | Organization | Type | Ref. |
|---|---|---|---|
| 1914 | American Academy of Arts and Sciences | International Honorary Member | |
| 1926 | Royal Society | Foreign Member | |
| 1926 | Royal Netherlands Academy of Arts and Sciences | Foreign Member | |
| 1926 | National Academy of Sciences | International Member | |
| 1933 | American Philosophical Society | International Member | |
| 1936 | Pontifical Academy of Sciences | Academician | |

=== Honors ===
| Year | Country | Honor | Ref. |
|---|---|---|---|
| 1915 | Germany | Pour le Mérite | |

=== Awards ===
| Year | Organization | Award | Citation | Ref. |
|---|---|---|---|---|
| 1918 | Royal Swedish Academy of Sciences | Nobel Prize in Physics | "In recognition of the services he rendered to the advancement of Physics by his discovery of energy quanta." | |
| 1927 | Franklin Institute | Franklin Medal | "For his law of radiation and the idea of the fundamental indivisible quantity of radiant energy called the 'quantum'." | |
| 1927 | Royal Netherlands Academy of Arts and Sciences | Lorentz Medal | — | |
| 1929 | Royal Society | Copley Medal | "For his contributions to theoretical physics and especially as the originator of the quantum theory." | |
| 1929 | German Physical Society | Max Planck Medal (Note: Awarded jointly with Albert Einstein.) | — | |
| 1945 | — | Goethe Prize | — | |

== Commemoration ==
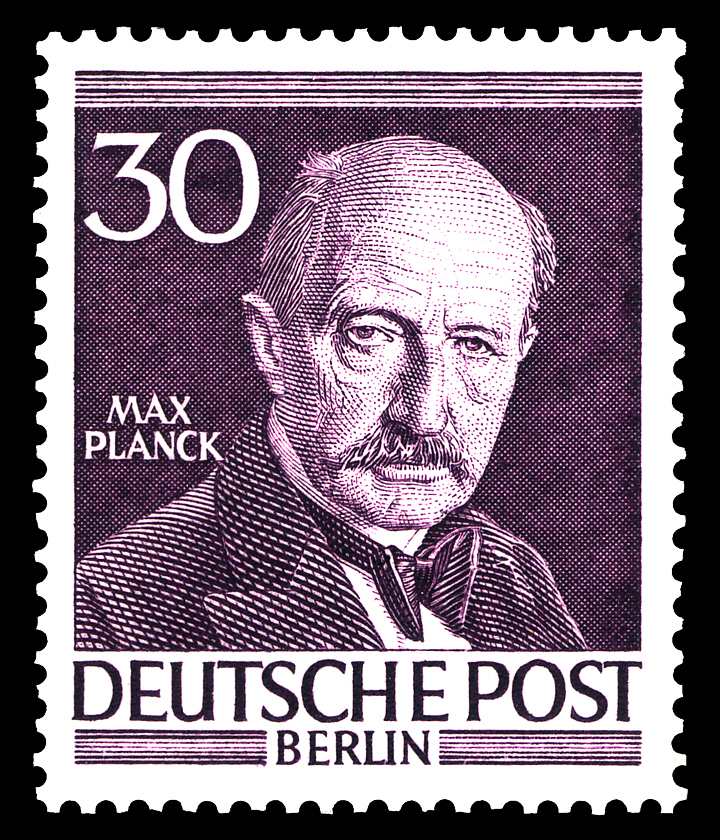
Planck on a 1952 West German stamp.

- In 1953, the German Post Office Berlin honored Max Planck with a 30-pfennig stamp in the series "Men from Berlin's History."
- From 1957 to 1971, the Federal Republic's 2-DM coins featured Max Planck's portrait.
- In 1958, a commemorative plaque was unveiled in the forecourt of the Humboldt University of Berlin.
- In 1958, the Max Planck Society presented a bust of Planck, created in 1939, to the Physical Society of the GDR. The bust has been on display in the exhibition room of the Magnushaus since 1991.
- In 1970, the lunar crater Planck and the adjacent valley Vallis Planck were named after Planck.
- In 1983, the GDR issued a 5-mark commemorative coin to mark his 125th birthday. This was not a circulating coin, but was primarily sold for foreign currency.
- In 1989, a Berlin commemorative plaque was unveiled at Planck's former residence in Berlin-Grunewald.
- In 2008, a special postage stamp and a 10-Euro silver commemorative coin were issued to mark his 150th birthday.
- In 2013, The Max Planck Florida Institute For Neuroscience opened in Jupiter, Florida.
- In 2014, Google celebrated Planck's 156th birthday with a Google Doodle on April 23.
- In 2022, his bust was placed in Walhalla.

== Publications ==
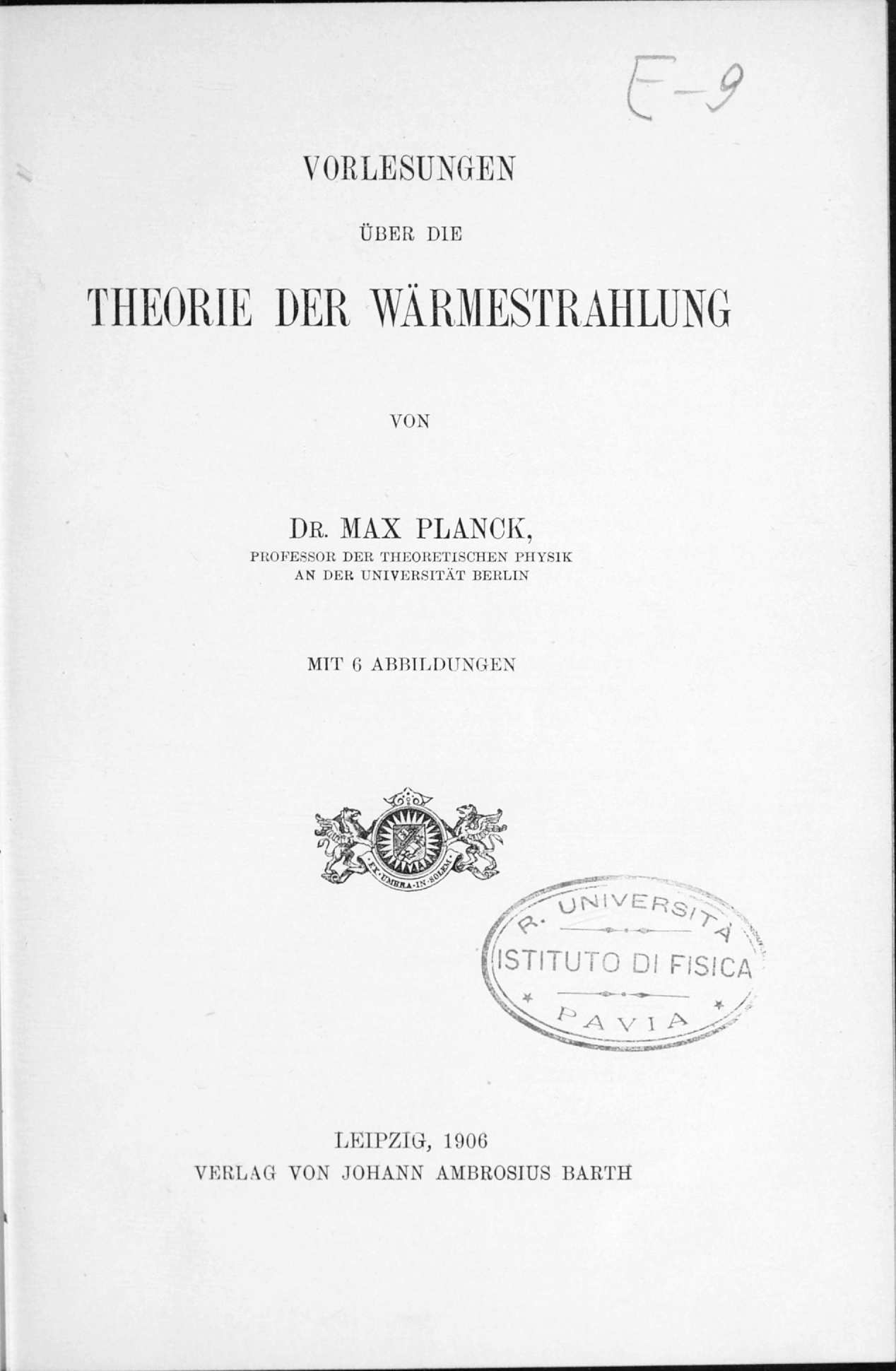
Vorlesungen über die Theorie der Wärmestrahlung, 1906

- Planck, M. (1900a). "Über eine Verbesserung der Wienschen Spektralgleichung". Verhandlungen der Deutschen Physikalischen Gesellschaft. 2: 202–204. Translated in ter Haar, D. (1967). "On an Improvement of Wien's Equation for the Spectrum" ( (PDF)). The Old Quantum Theory (PDF). Pergamon Press. pp. 79–81. LCCN 66029628. Archived from the original on 13 February 2024.
- Planck, M. (1900b). "Zur Theorie des Gesetzes der Energieverteilung im Normalspectrum". Verhandlungen der Deutschen Physikalischen Gesellschaft. 2: 237. Translated in ter Haar, D. (1967). "On the Theory of the Energy Distribution Law of the Normal Spectrum" ( (PDF)). The Old Quantum Theory. Pergamon Press. p. 82. LCCN 66029628. Archived from the original on 20 September 2016.
- Planck, M. (1900c). "Entropie und Temperatur strahlender Wärme" [Entropy and Temperature of Radiant Heat]. Annalen der Physik. 306 (4): 719–737. Bibcode:1900AnP...306..719P. doi:10.1002/andp.19003060410.
- Planck, M. (1900d). "Über irreversible Strahlungsvorgänge" [On Irreversible Radiation Processes]. Annalen der Physik. 306 (1): 69–122. Bibcode:1900AnP...306...69P. doi:10.1002/andp.19003060105.
- Planck, M. (1901). "Ueber das Gesetz der Energieverteilung im Normalspektrum". Annalen der Physik. 309 (3): 553–563. Bibcode:1901AnP...309..553P. doi:10.1002/andp.19013090310. Translated in Ando, K. "On the Law of Distribution of Energy in the Normal Spectrum" (PDF). Archived from the original (PDF) on 6 October 2011.
- Planck, M. (1903). Treatise on Thermodynamics. Ogg, A. (transl.). London: Longmans, Green & Co. OL 7246691M.
- Planck, M. (1906). Vorlesungen über die Theorie der Wärmestrahlung. Leipzig: J.A. Barth. LCCN 07004527.
- Planck, M. (1914). The Theory of Heat Radiation. Masius, M. (transl.) (2nd ed.). P. Blakiston's Son & Co. OL 7154661M.
- Planck, M. (1915). Eight Lectures on Theoretical Physics. Translated by Albert Potter Wills.
- Planck, M. (1908). Prinzip der Erhaltung der Energie.
- Planck, M. (1943). "Zur Geschichte der Auffindung des physikalischen Wirkungsquantums". Naturwissenschaften. 31 (14–15): 153–159. arXiv:2403.09689. Bibcode:1943NW.....31..153P. doi:10.1007/BF01475738. S2CID 44899488.

== See also ==
- German inventors and discoverers
- Photon polarization
- Statue of Max Planck
- Zero-point energy

== Sources ==
- Aczel, Amir D. Entanglement, Chapter 4. (Penguin, 2003) ISBN 978-0-452-28457-9
- Heilbron, J. L. (2000). The Dilemmas of an Upright Man: Max Planck and the Fortunes of German Science. Harvard University Press. ISBN 0-674-00439-6.
- Pickover, Clifford A. Archimedes to Hawking: Laws of Science and the Great Minds Behind Them, Oxford University Press, 2008, ISBN 978-0-19-533611-5
- Medawar, Jean; Pyke, David (2012). Hitler's Gift: The True Story of the Scientists Expelled by the Nazi Regime (Paperback). New York: Arcade Publishing. ISBN 978-1-61145-709-4.
- Rosenthal-Schneider, Ilse Reality and Scientific Truth: Discussions with Einstein, von Laue, and Planck (Wayne State University, 1980) ISBN 0-8143-1650-6
