= Erwin Planck =

German politician and resistance member (1893–1945)

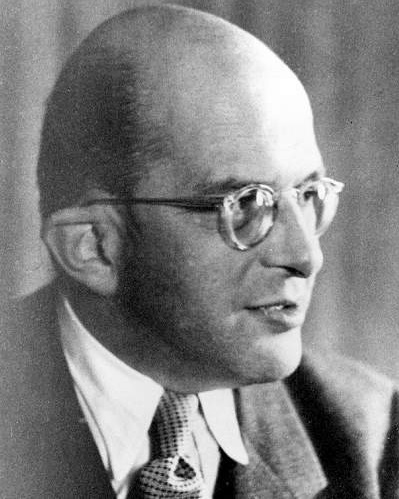
Erwin Planck, about 1932

Erwin Planck (12 March 1893 – 23 January 1945) was a German politician, and a resistance fighter against the Nazi regime.

== Biography ==
Born in Charlottenburg (today part of Berlin), Erwin Planck was the fourth child of Nobel Prize-winning physicist Max Planck (1858–1947) and his first wife Marie, née Merck (1861–1909). His father held a professorship at the Berlin Frederick William University since 1889 and had become a notable member of the German Physical Society (DPG); his children grew up in the wealthy environment of the Grunewald mansions colony.

Having obtained his Abitur degree in 1911, Erwin Planck pursued a career as an officer in the German Army. In World War I, he soon found himself a prisoner of the French forces in 1914. Planck returned to Germany in 1917 and was active on the General Staff. There, he met Major Kurt von Schleicher, the beginning of a lifelong friendship.

After the war, Major Schleicher became head of the political department in the newly established Ministry of the Reichswehr and, in 1920, appointed Planck his assistant. In January 1924, Schleicher sent him as a liaison officer to the Reich Chancellery, where Planck also became a government official after he left the Reichswehr armed forces in 1926. Upon the downfall of the Brüning government in 1932, he became a deputy minister under Chancellor Franz von Papen, and retained that post when Schleicher himself was appointed Reich Chancellor in December. Planck contributed to Schleicher's Querfront to gain Nazi support for his government, though to no avail.

After Schleicher resigned and Adolf Hitler was appointed Chancellor on 30 January 1933, Planck went into temporary retirement and travelled abroad to East Asia for a year. Shortly after he came back to Germany, Kurt von Schleicher and his wife were shot at their Babelsberg home by members of the Sicherheitsdienst (SD) in the Night of the Long Knives on 30 June 1934. Planck tried in vain to get an explanation for his friend's murder. He also held several conspiratorial talks with Reichswehr General Werner von Fritsch which, however, did not lead to any conclusion.

In 1936, Planck changed career paths and went into business, becoming a leading employee at the Otto Wolff corporate group, a large conglomerate in Cologne. In 1939, he took over leadership of the Berlin branch office.

In August 1939, on the eve of World War II, a group including Prussian Finance Minister Johannes Popitz, Planck, and Reichsbank president Hjalmar Schacht approached General Georg Thomas, head of the Defence Economy and Armament Office, asking him to thwart the outbreak of the forthcoming invasion of Poland. Thomas agreed to write a memorandum to his superior, OKW Chief Wilhelm Keitel, in which he stated that a war against Poland would set off a world war that Germany could not win owing to massive supply problems. However, Keitel tried to allay Thomas's fears by telling him that Hitler was planning no such war.

In 1940, Planck, Popitz, Ulrich von Hassell and General Ludwig Beck drafted a "Provisional Constitution", on the assumption that the forthcoming attack on the Western Front would lead to the overthrow of Hitler's regime. Even afterwards, Planck stayed in the conservative resistance circles around Carl Friedrich Goerdeler and was involved in the preparations for the 20 July plot. This led to his arrest on 23 July 1944, after which he was taken to the Gestapo headquarters at the Reichssicherheitshauptamt (RSHA).

Erwin Planck was sentenced to death in a show trial at the "People's Court" (Volksgerichtshof) on 23 October. On 25 October, Max Planck personally drafted a letter to Adolf Hitler pleading for Erwin's life, a plea that was ignored. Planck was executed by hanging on 23 January 1945 at Plötzensee Prison in Berlin.

== Memorial plaque ==
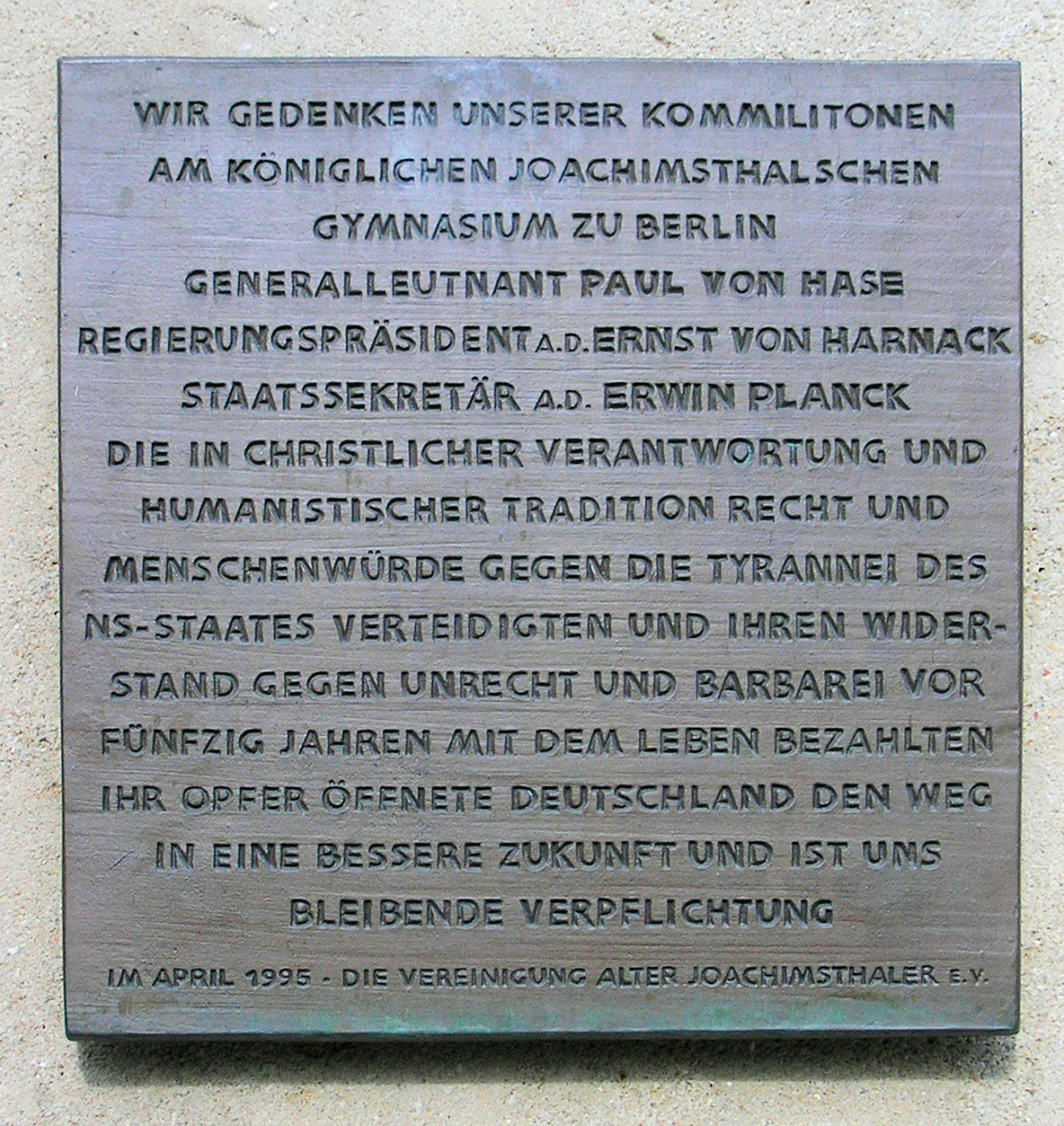
Memorial plaque, Joachimsthalsches Gymnasium

A memorial plaque dedicated to Erwin Planck and his fellow students Paul von Hase and Ernst von Harnack can be found at his old school, the Joachimsthalsches Gymnasium in the Berlin borough of Wilmersdorf.

== Sources ==
- Plötzensee Prison
