= Planck's principle =

Principle that scientific change is generational

In sociology of scientific knowledge, Planck's principle is the view that scientific change does not occur because individual scientists change their mind, but rather that successive generations of scientists have different views. It is named after the physicist Max Planck, who stated a version of it in his autobiography.

== Formulation ==
The principle as formulated in his own words:

A new scientific truth does not triumph by convincing its opponents and making them see the light, but rather because its opponents eventually die and a new generation grows up that is familiar with it ...

An important scientific innovation rarely makes its way by gradually winning over and converting its opponents: it rarely happens that Saul becomes Paul. What does happen is that its opponents gradually die out, and that the growing generation is familiarized with the ideas from the beginning: another instance of the fact that the future lies with the youth.

— Max Planck, Scientific autobiography, 1950, p. 33, 97

Often the more concise "Science progresses one funeral at a time" is used which was originated by Paul A. Samuelson.

== Adoption ==
Planck's quote has been used by Thomas Kuhn, Paul Feyerabend, and others to argue scientific revolutions are non-rational, rather than spread through "mere force of truth and fact".

Eric Hoffer, the longshoreman-philosopher, cites Planck's Principle in support of his views on drastic social change and the nature of mass movements. According to Hoffer's May 20, 1959 journal entry, the successful navigation of drastic change requires "endowment ... with a new identity and a sense of rebirth" as was the case with Moses and the Exodus. Only after forty years in the desert could Moses transform Hebrew slaves into free men, that is, a new generation:

"Moses discovered that no migration, no drama, no spectacle, no myth, and no miracles could turn slaves into free men. It cannot be done. So he led the slaves back into the desert, and waited forty years until the slave generation died, and a new generation, desert born and bred, was ready to enter the promised land.

"All revolutionary leaders, though they fervently preach change, know that people cannot change. Unlike Moses they have neither a handy desert nor the patience to wait forty years. Hence the purges and the terror to get rid of the grown-up generation.

"It is of interest that even in the objective world of science man's mind is not more malleable than in the habit-bound world of everyday life. Max Planck maintained that a new scientific truth does not triumph by convincing its opponents, but because its opponents eventually die, and a new generation grows up that is familiar with it. Here, too, you need forty years in the desert" (175-176).

== Rebuttal ==
Whether age influences the readiness to accept new ideas has been empirically criticised. In the case of acceptance of evolution in the years after Darwin's On the Origin of Species, age was a minor factor. On a more specialized scale, it also was a weak factor in accepting cliometrics. A study of when different geologists accepted plate tectonics found that older scientists actually adopted it sooner than younger scientists. However, a more recent study on life science researchers found that following the deaths of preeminent researchers, publications by their collaborators rapidly declined while the activity of non-collaborators and the number of new researchers entering their field rose.
