= Statue of Max Planck =

Statue in Berlin, Germany

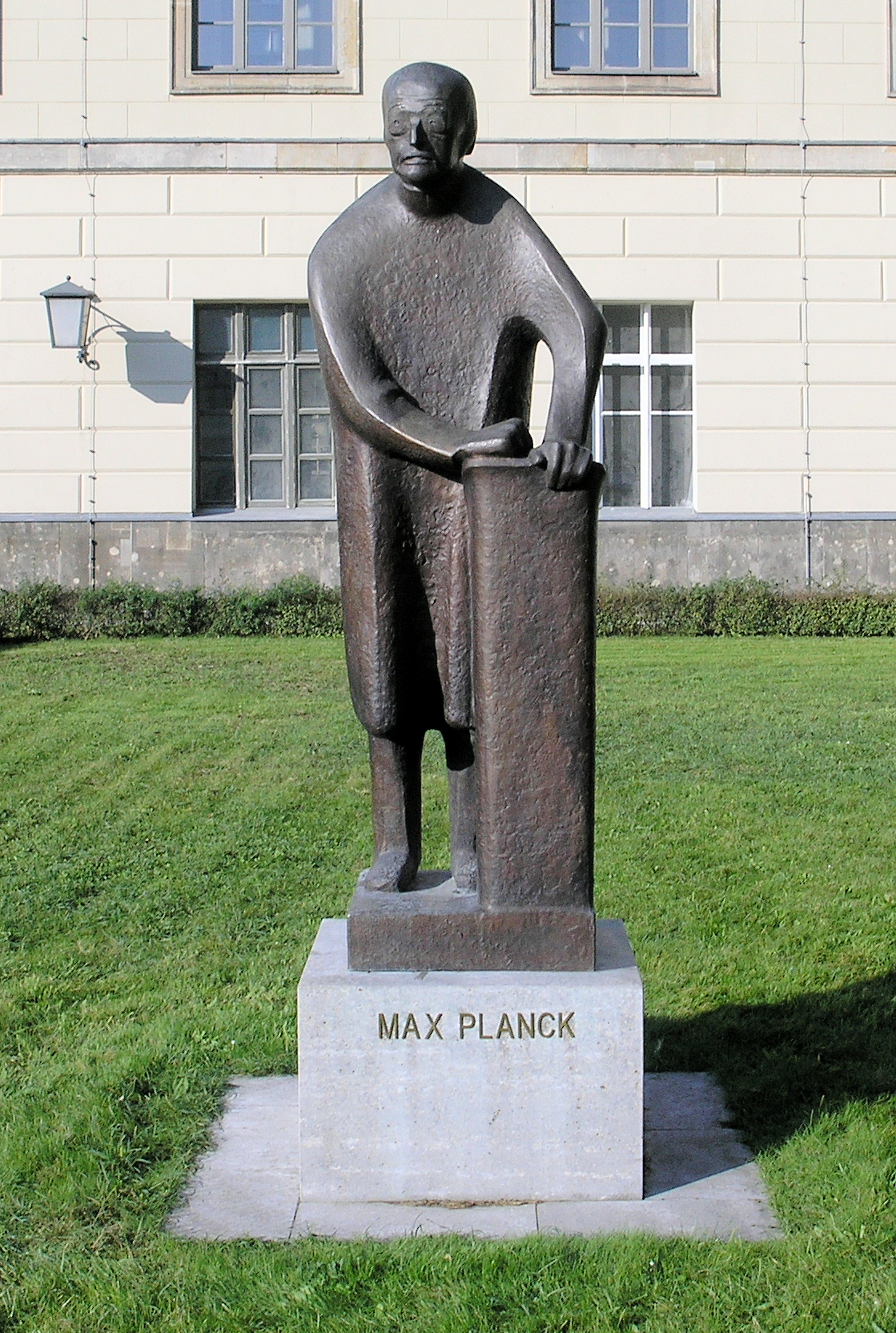
- The statue in 2010
- Artist: Bernhard Heiliger
- Subject: Max Planck
- Location: Berlin, Germany; 52°31′04″N 13°23′37″E

The statue of Max Planck by Bernhard Heiliger at Humboldt University of Berlin in Berlin-Mitte, Germany.
