= Unfoldment =

Unfoldment may refer to:

- Unfoldment in implicate and explicate order, concepts for quantum theory coined by physicist David Bohm
- The Unfoldment, a lost 1922 silent film

== See also ==
- Unfold (disambiguation)
