= Unfold =

Unfold may refer to:

== Science ==
- Unfoldable cardinal, in mathematics
- Unfold (higher-order function), in computer science a family of anamorphism functions
- Unfoldment (disambiguation), in spirituality and physics
- Unfolded protein response, in biochemistry
- Equilibrium unfolding, in biochemistry
- Unfolded state (denatured protein), in biochemistry
- Maximum variance unfolding (semidefinite embedding), in computer science

== Music ==
- Unfold (Marié Digby album), 2008
- Unfold (John O'Callaghan album), 2011
- Unfold (Almah album), 2013
- Unfold (The Necks album), 2017
- "Unfold" (Porter Robinson song), 2021
- "Unfold", a song by De La Soul from the 2016 album And the Anonymous Nobody...

== Technology ==
- Unfold (app), mobile application

== See also ==
- Fold (disambiguation)
