= Planck postulate =

Principle of quantum physics

The Planck postulate (or Planck's postulate), one of the fundamental principles of quantum mechanics, is the postulate that the energy of oscillators in a black body is quantized, and is given by

$$E=nh\nu\,,$$

where $n$ is an integer (1, 2, 3, ...), $h$ is the Planck constant, and $\nu$ (the Greek letter nu) is the frequency of the oscillator.

The postulate was introduced by Max Planck in his derivation of his law of black body radiation in 1900. This assumption allowed Planck to derive a formula for the entire spectrum of the radiation emitted by a black body. Planck was unable to justify this assumption based on classical physics; he considered quantization as being purely a mathematical trick, rather than (as is now known) a fundamental change in the understanding of the world. In other words, Planck then contemplated virtual oscillators.

In 1905, Albert Einstein adapted the Planck postulate to explain the photoelectric effect, but Einstein proposed that the energy of photons themselves was quantized (with photon energy given by the Planck–Einstein relation), and that quantization was not merely a feature of microscopic oscillators. Planck's postulate was further applied to understanding the Compton effect, and was applied by Niels Bohr to explain the emission spectrum of the hydrogen atom and derive the correct value of the Rydberg constant.
