= Unfolding (sculpture) =

Public art work by Bernhard Heiliger

Coordinates: 43°10′37.1″N 87°56′12.9″W

- Artist: Bernhard Heiliger
- Year: 1968
- Type: bronze
- Location: Lynden Sculpture Garden; Milwaukee, Wisconsin
- Owner: Bradley Family Foundation

Unfolding is a public art work by artist Bernhard Heiliger located at the Lynden Sculpture Garden near Milwaukee, Wisconsin. The sculpture has an abstract form; it is installed on the patio.
