= Bernhard Heiliger =

German sculptor

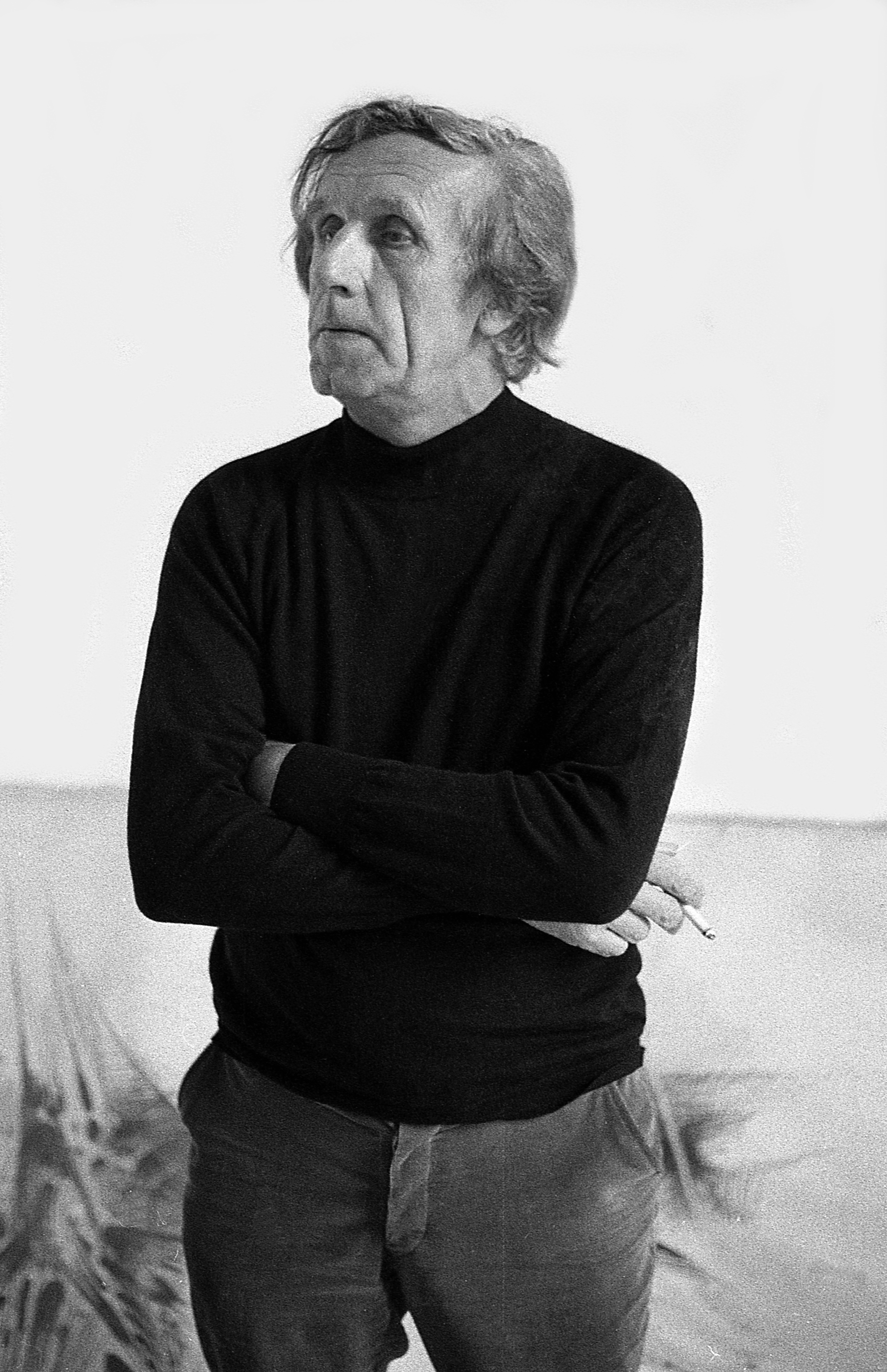
Bernhard Heiliger

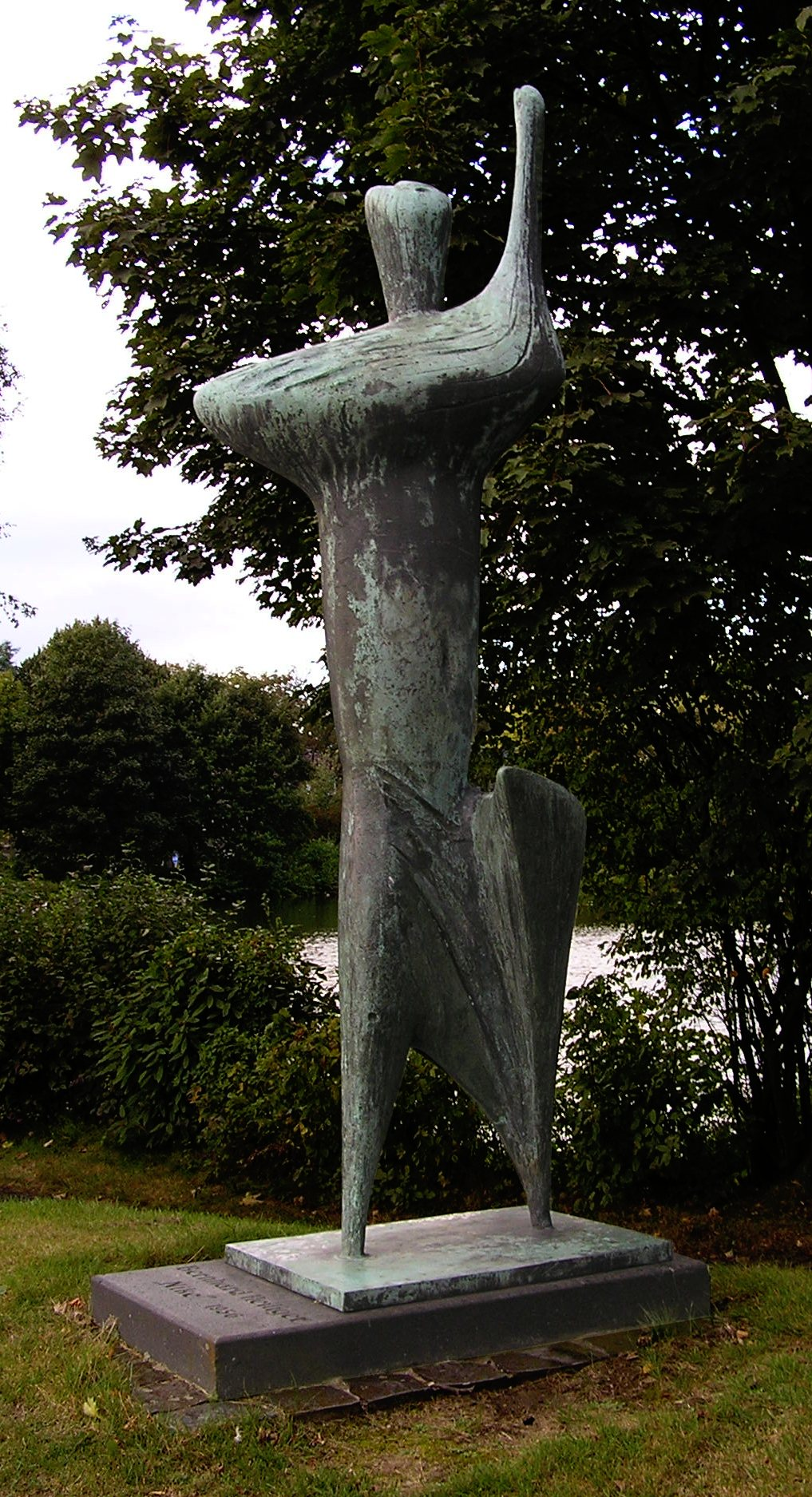
Nike (1956), located in Marl

Bernhard Heiliger (11 November 1915, Stettin – 25 October 1995, Berlin) was a German artist. He was considered "West Germany's foremost sculptor", and his large public artworks are a prominent presence in many German cities, especially Berlin.

== Biography ==
Heiliger began his artistic education with an apprenticeship as a stone carver and a course of study at the Stettiner Werkschule für Gestaltende Arbeiten from 1933 to 1936 under Kurt Schwerdtfeger, who had been a student of the Bauhaus. After this he attended the Staatlichen Hochschule für bildende Künste (National College of Visual Arts) in 1938, where he studied under Arno Breker. In 1941 he was drafted into the army and served as a radio operator on the Eastern Front for two years, before he received an exemption from military service through the intervention of Breker. Despite this he was drafted again in 1944, after which he fled as a deserter through northern Germany.

In May 1946 Heiliger exhibits with the painter Fritz Ascher at the Karl Buchholz Gallery in Berlin. Heiliger's design for the Memorial to Unknown Political Prisoners (1953) brought him his first international recognition, earning him the Prize of the National Government and a prize from the Institute of Contemporary Arts. This was followed by his participation in several prominent international exhibits, such as the documenta I & II in Kassel (1955 and 1959) and the Venice Biennale (1956), and by commissions such as sculptures for the German pavilion at the 1958 World's Fair in Brussels. In 1956 he became a member of the Berlin Academy of Art. In 1974 he was recognized with the Federal Cross of Merit, and in 1984 was awarded an honorary membership in the Deutscher Künstlerbund.

He died in Berlin in 1995, and was buried in Berlin's Dahlem Cemetery (Friedhof Dahlem).

== Work ==
Heiliger's diverse output stretches from his early, organically abstracted figures to his late nonobjective, geometric abstractions. His early work (1945–1962), focuses on the human figure, which is treated in an organic style influenced by Aristide Maillol and Henry Moore. Also from this period is a series of portrait busts of prominent contemporary Germans. The artist departed from the human figure in his second period (1962–1970), instead developing imagery of the "flight of birds and vegetable forms" influenced by the nonrepresentational Informel style. The seven-meter-high The Flame (Flamme, 1962–63), commissioned by the city of Berlin for Ernst-Reuter-Platz, is considered the key work in the transition between the early and middle periods. The Five Continents (Die fünf Erdteile, 1961), by contrast, still alludes to the human figure in the torso-like shapes that make up the composition.

Kosmos 70, commissioned in 1970 by the city of Berlin for the restored Reichstag building, marks the transition into Heiliger's final period, where spheres and angular forms linked by lines of wire allude to planets and solar systems. The different stylistic phases in Heiliger's career are connected to changes in material: whereas his works from the 1950s and 1960s are cast materials, such as cast stone or bronze, the works from the 1970s onward are most often made of stainless steel or corten steel.

Selected works
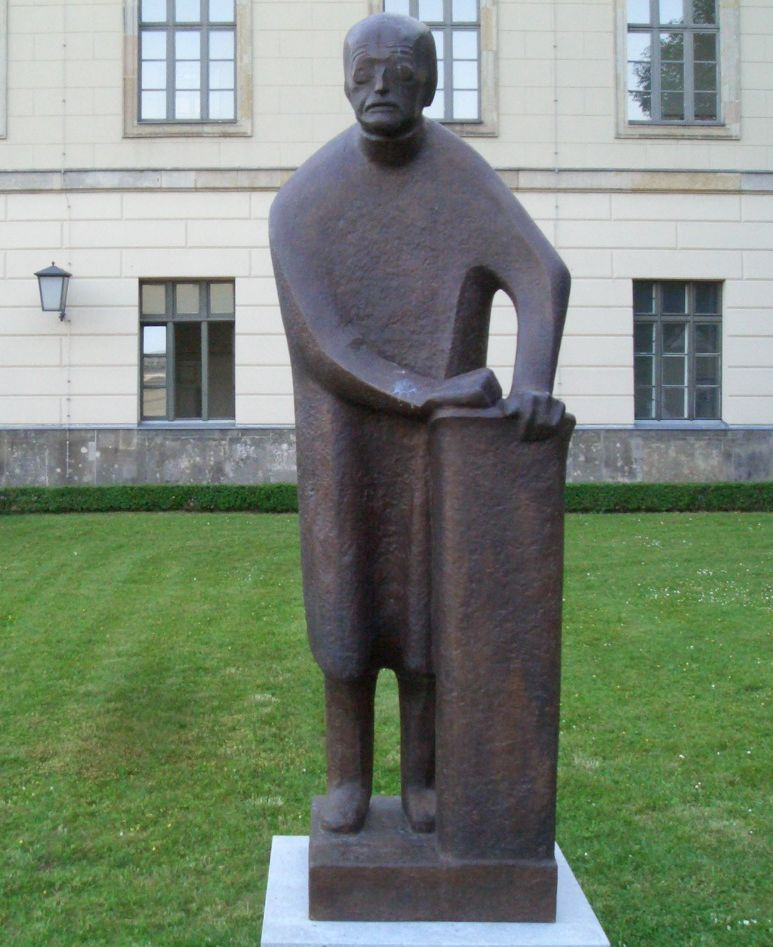
Max Planck (1948-9), an example of Heiliger's early work

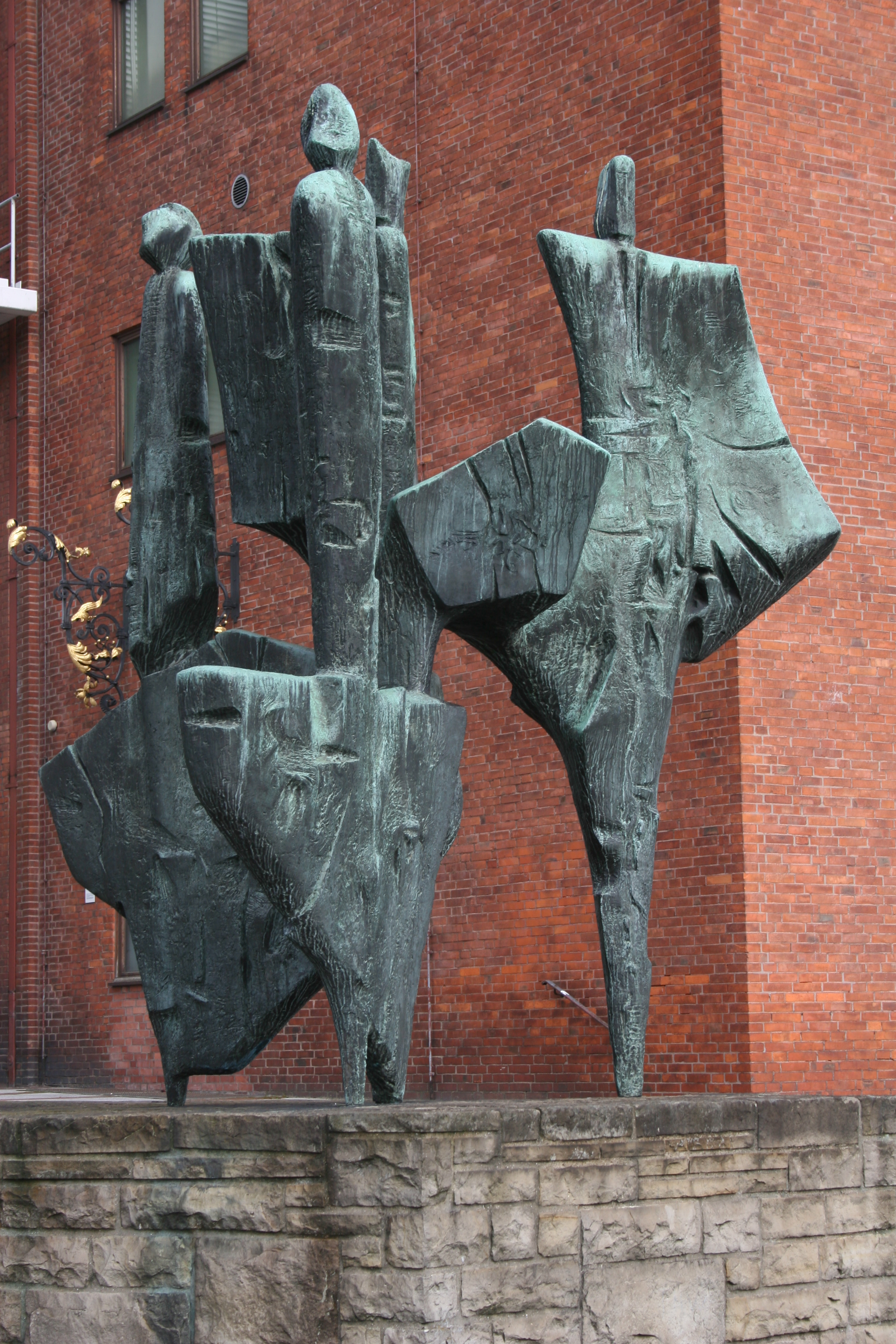
The Five Continents (1961), a work that straddles the early and middle periods

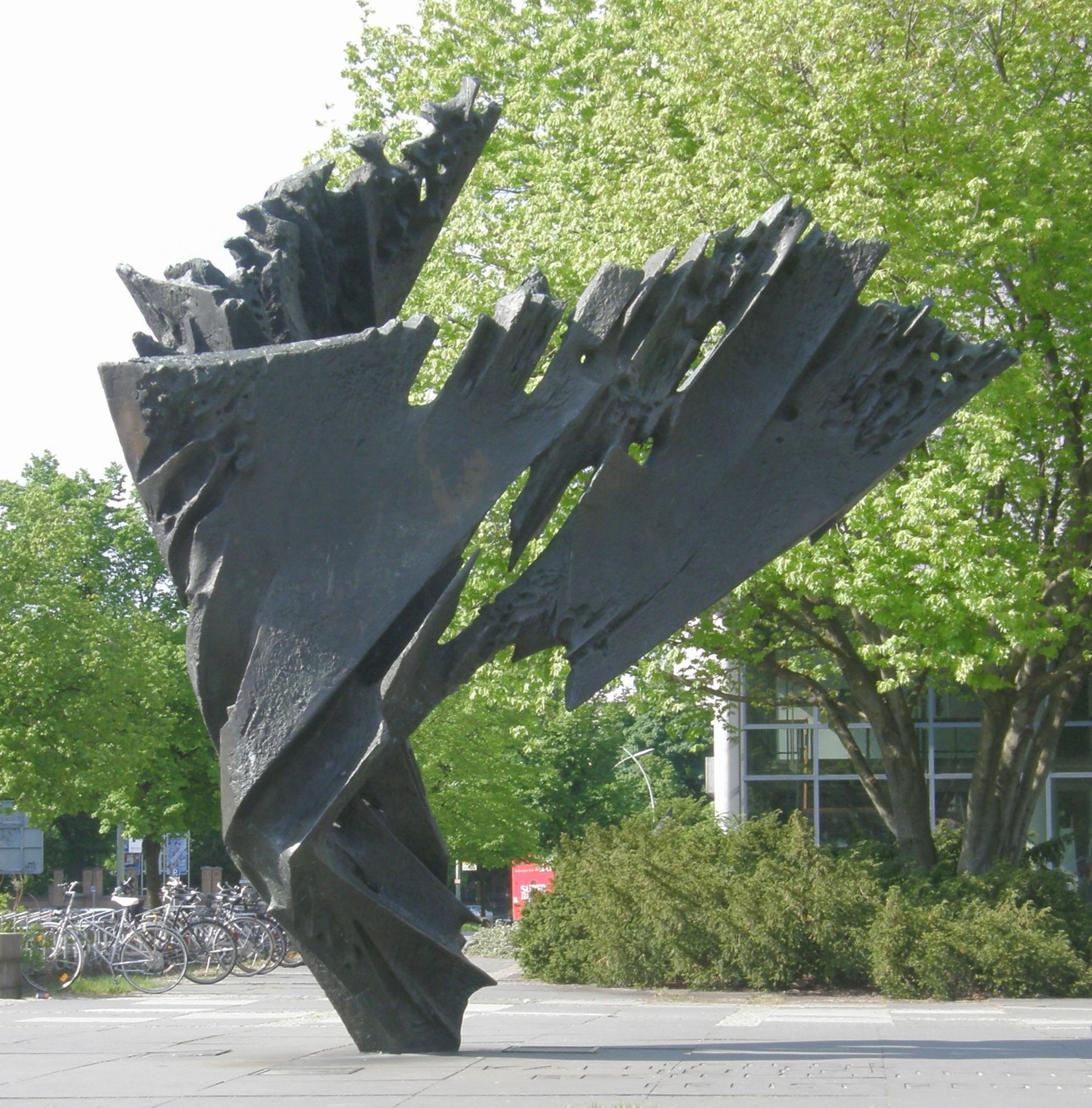
The Flame (1962-3), the first major work of the middle period

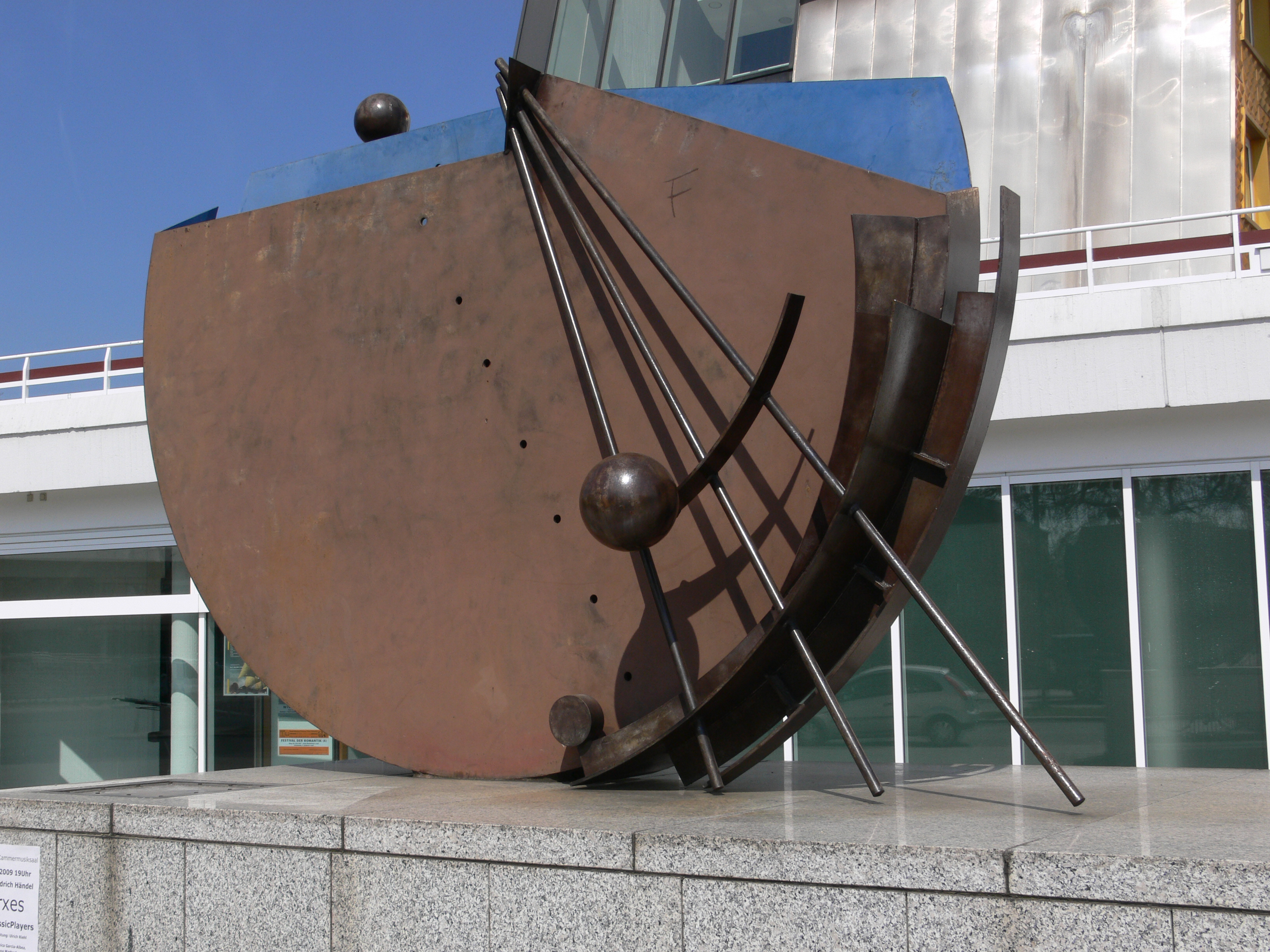
Echo I (1987), representing the late, geometric period

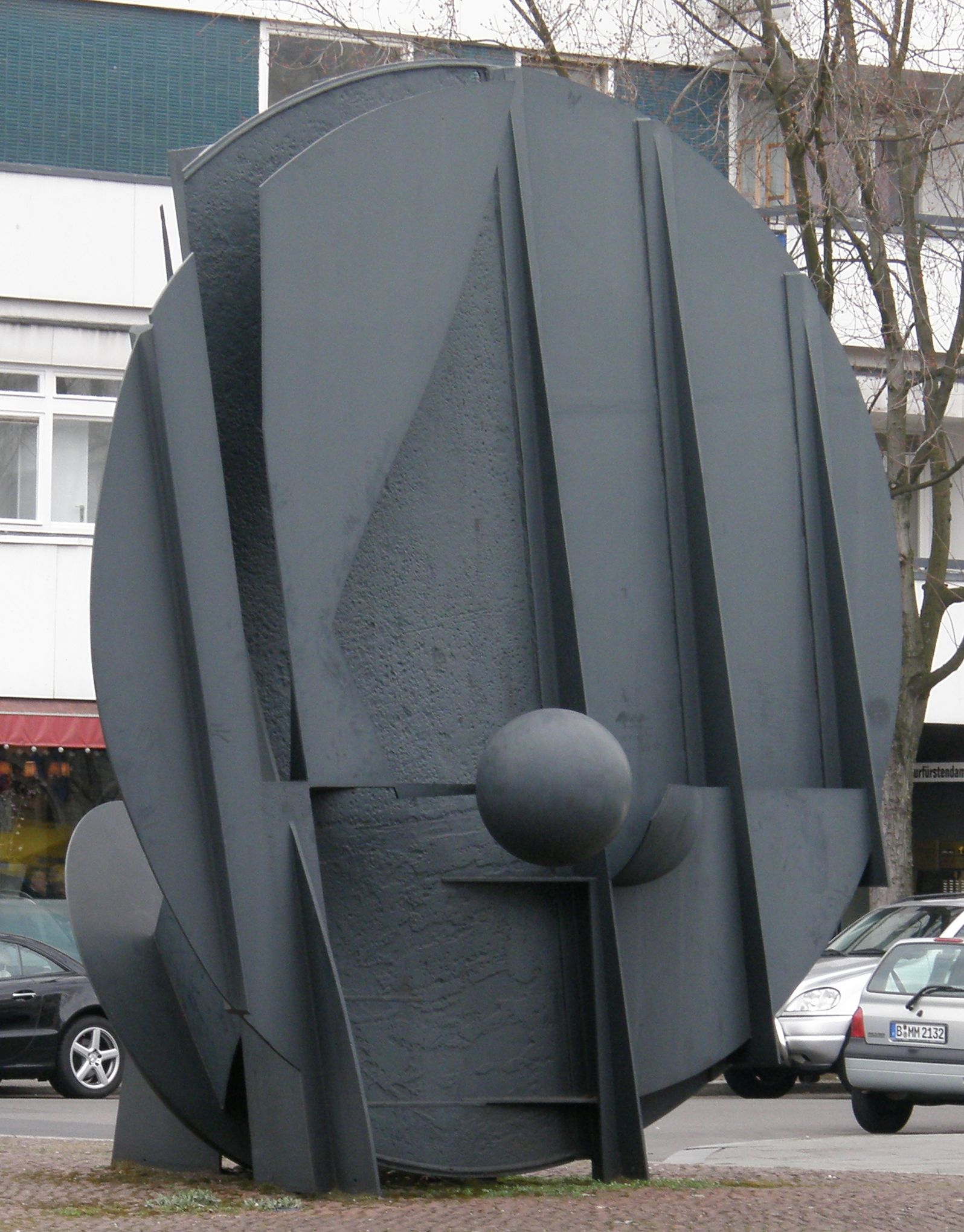
Eye of the Nemesis (1989), a late work and the last of three major commissions from the city of Berlin

== Legacy ==
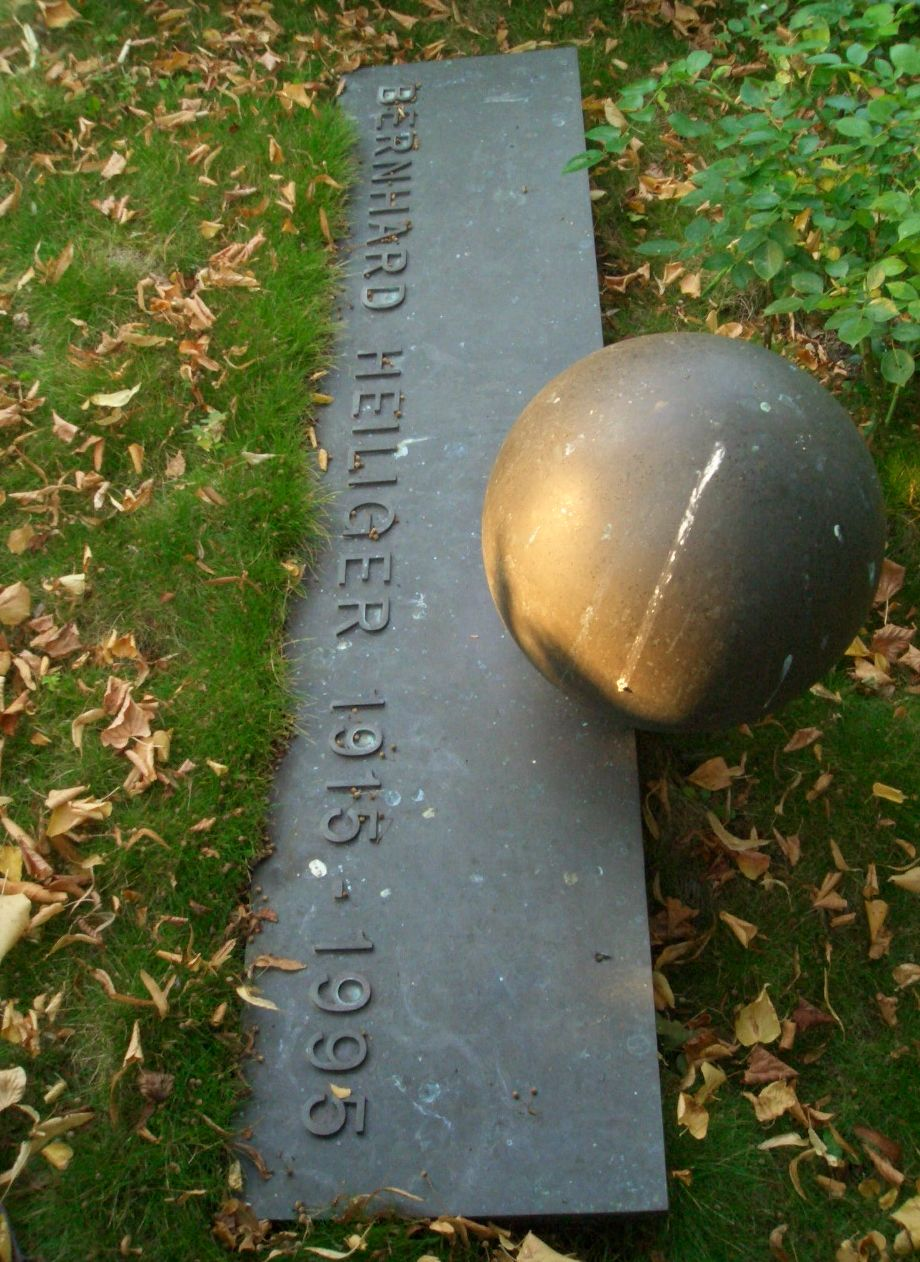
Heiliger's grave in Berlin

The Bernhard-Heiliger-Stiftung (Bernhard Heiliger Foundation) was founded in 1996 and is located in his former studio in Berlin-Dahlem near the Brücke-Museum. Since 1999 the foundation has conferred the € 15,000 Bernhard Heiliger Award of Sculpture upon a noted sculptor every four years. The laureates so far are:

- 1999- Bertrand Lavier
- 2003- Fritz Schwegler
- 2007- Antony Gormley
- 2011 - Fabian Marcaccio
- 2015 - Suspended, no award given

Since 1997 the Foundation has also annually awarded grants to young sculptors.

Heiliger's son Stefan Heiliger is a well-known furniture designer.

== Selected further reading ==
- Bernhard Heiliger 1915-1995 – Kosmis eines Bildhauers, ed. Marc Wellmann on behalf of the Bernhard Heiliger Foundation, Wienand Verlag, 2005
- Bernhard Heiliger – Die Köpfe, Wienand Verlag, 2000
- Lothar Romain, Siegfried Salzmann (ed.): Bernhard Heiliger, Propyläen, 1989
