= Planck relation =

Energy–frequency relation in quantum mechanics

The Planck relation (referred to as Planck's energy–frequency relation, the Planck–Einstein relation, Planck equation, and Planck formula, though the latter might also refer to Planck's law) is a fundamental equation in quantum mechanics which states that the photon energy E is proportional to the photon frequency ν (or f):
$$E = h \nu = h f.$$
The constant of proportionality, h, is known as the Planck constant. Several equivalent forms of the relation exist, including in terms of angular frequency ω:
$$E = \hbar \omega,$$
where the reduced Planck constant is $\hbar = h / 2 \pi$.

The relation accounts for the quantized nature of light and plays a key role in understanding phenomena such as the photoelectric effect and black-body radiation (where the related Planck postulate can be used to derive Planck's law).

== Spectral forms ==
Light can be characterized using several spectral quantities, such as frequency ν, wavelength λ, wavenumber $\tilde{\nu}$, and their angular equivalents (angular frequency ω, angular wavelength y, and angular wavenumber k). These quantities are related through
$$\nu = \frac{c}{\lambda} = c \tilde \nu = \frac{\omega}{2 \pi} = \frac{c}{2 \pi y} = \frac{ck}{2 \pi},$$
so the Planck relation can take the following "standard" forms:
$$E = h \nu = \frac{hc}{\lambda} = h c \tilde \nu,$$
as well as the following "angular" forms:
$$E = \hbar \omega = \frac{\hbar c}{y} = \hbar c k.$$

The standard forms make use of the Planck constant h. The angular forms make use of the reduced Planck constant ħ = h/2π. Here c is the speed of light.

== de Broglie relation ==
The de Broglie relation, also known as de Broglie's momentum–wavelength relation, generalizes the Planck relation to matter waves. Louis de Broglie argued that if particles had a wave nature, the relation E = hν would also apply to them, and postulated that particles would have a wavelength equal to λ = h/p. Combining de Broglie's postulate with the Planck–Einstein relation leads to
$$p = h \tilde \nu$$
or
$$p = \hbar k.$$

The de Broglie relation is also often encountered in vector form
$$\mathbf{p} = \hbar \mathbf{k},$$
where p is the momentum vector, and k is the angular wave vector.

== Bohr's frequency condition ==
Bohr's frequency condition states that the frequency of a photon absorbed or emitted during an electronic transition is related to the energy difference (ΔE) between the two energy levels involved in the transition:
$$\Delta E = h \nu.$$

This is a direct consequence of the Planck–Einstein relation.

== See also ==
- Compton wavelength

== Cited bibliography ==
- Cohen-Tannoudji, C., Diu, B., Laloë, F. (1973/1977). Quantum Mechanics, translated from the French by S.R. Hemley, N. Ostrowsky, D. Ostrowsky, second edition, volume 1, Wiley, New York, ISBN 0471164321.
- French, A.P., Taylor, E.F. (1978). An Introduction to Quantum Physics, Van Nostrand Reinhold, London, ISBN 0-442-30770-5.
- Griffiths, D.J. (1995). Introduction to Quantum Mechanics, Prentice Hall, Upper Saddle River NJ, ISBN 0-13-124405-1.
- Landé, A. (1951). Quantum Mechanics, Sir Isaac Pitman & Sons, London.
- Landsberg, P.T. (1978). Thermodynamics and Statistical Mechanics, Oxford University Press, Oxford UK, ISBN 0-19-851142-6.
- Messiah, A. (1958/1961). Quantum Mechanics, volume 1, translated from the French by G.M. Temmer, North-Holland, Amsterdam.
- Schwinger, J. (2001). Quantum Mechanics: Symbolism of Atomic Measurements, edited by B.-G. Englert, Springer, Berlin, ISBN 3-540-41408-8.
- van der Waerden, B.L. (1967). Sources of Quantum Mechanics, edited with a historical introduction by B.L. van der Waerden, North-Holland Publishing, Amsterdam.
- Weinberg, S. (1995). The Quantum Theory of Fields, volume 1, Foundations, Cambridge University Press, Cambridge UK, ISBN 978-0-521-55001-7.
- Weinberg, S. (2013). Lectures on Quantum Mechanics, Cambridge University Press, Cambridge UK, ISBN 978-1-107-02872-2.
