= List of file formats for luminaire radiometric data =

This list article lists file formats for luminaire radiometric data. File formats from standards organizations are grouped in Table 1 and other formats appear in Table 2.

== Overview ==
Computer files using these formats are designed to be imported into lighting simulation software for architectural lighting design, and are not readily interpreted by human readers. They typically contain data describing the light output of luminaires (i.e., light fixtures), but can also represent the lamps (i.e., light bulbs) and other kinds of light sources used within luminaires. If such a file exists for a given lighting product, it can usually be obtained from a vendor (e.g., manufacturer website).

Some formats were only designed to describe visible radiation (i.e., light), but can be adapted to describe other kinds of optical radiation—namely ultraviolet radiation and/or infrared radiation—if the file is appropriately annotated and the user understands the deviation. Other formats were explicitly designed to describe any kind of optical radiation to support the design and analysis of systems for germicidal, horticulture, lighting, heating, and other applications.

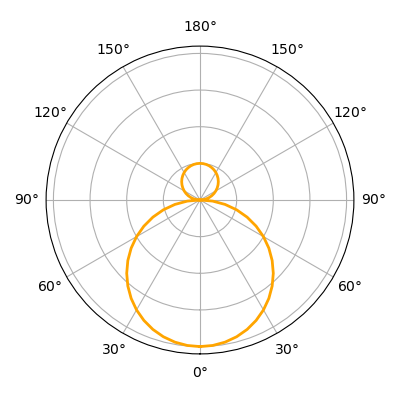
Polar plot of the luminous intensity distribution for a luminaire with Lambertian downlight (80%) and uplight (20%)

Whereas photometry covers the measurement of light (typically weighted by wavelength according to a luminous efficiency function), radiometry more broadly covers the measurement of optical radiation (sometimes extended to other kinds of electromagnetic radiation) without regard for spectral sensitivity. Photometry is thus a subset or branch of radiometry. This page focuses on file formats that include one or more of the following kinds of radiometric data:

- Luminous intensity distribution — captures luminous intensity data in multiple directions. Such data is efficient in terms of digital information because luminous intensity is independent of distance (being the quotient of luminous flux and solid angle), provided the distance is sufficiently large to accurately represent the light source as a point. Typically measured using a goniophotometer.
- Radiant intensity distribution — captures radiant intensity data in multiple directions. Typically measured using a gonioradiometer.
- Spectral power distribution (SPD) — taken literally, an SPD captures the spectral distribution of radiant flux across a range of wavelengths. The term SPD can however also refer to the spectral distribution of other radiometric quantities (e.g., irradiance, radiance, radiant intensity). Sometimes termed spectrum, especially when expressed without measurement units. Typically measured using a spectroradiometer.
- Angular spectral radiant intensity distribution (ASRID) — captures spectral radiant intensity distributions (i.e., radiant intensity as a function of wavelength) in different directions. Typically measured using a goniometer equipped with a spectroradiometer (i.e., goniospectroradiometer).

These granular data can be used to calculate other metrics such as luminous flux (e.g., total lumen output), beam angle, and correlated color temperature. Notably, the reverse is often impossible (e.g., typically cannot derive SPD from CCT). With additional information, such as distance and angle of incidence, luminous intensity distribution data can also be used to calculate illuminance (by combining the cosine law with the inverse-square law) and other quantities.

Formats often accommodate additional kinds of data useful in designing systems (e.g., electrical input power, physical dimensions). Some formats can also contain photon intensity distribution data, which capture photon intensity data in multiple directions; such data is based on photon counting, which is distinct from radiometry and can for example be useful when designing horticultural lighting systems to provide sufficient photosynthetically active radiation (PAR).

== File formats listed ==
Table 1. File formats from standards organizations
File format	Filename extensions	Editions	Status	Supported kinds of distribution data
CIBSE TM14	.c1s, .cc, .cib, .tml	1988	Archived	Luminous intensity
EN 13032-1	.cen	2004, 2012	Active European standard, based on archived CIE 102-1993	Luminous intensity
IES LM-63	.ies	1986, 1991, 1995, 2002, 2019, 2025	Active ANSI standard	Luminous intensity
IES TM-27	.spdx	2014, 2020	Active ANSI standard	SPD
IES TM-33	.json, .xml	2018, 2023	Active ANSI standard	Luminous intensity, photon intensity, radiant intensity, SPD, ASRID
ISO 16739-1 (IFC)	.ifc, .ifcXML, .ifcZIP, .ttl, .rdf	2005, 2013, 2018, 2024	Active ISO standard	Luminous intensity
UNI 11733	.json, .xml	2019, 2020	Active Italian standard	Luminous intensity, photon intensity, radiant intensity, SPD, ASRID

Table 2. File formats not from standards organizations
File format	Filename extensions	Editions	Status	Supported kinds of distribution data
ATLA S001 and S001-A	.json, .xml	2018, 2021	Open file format, basis for IES TM-33 and UNI 11733	Luminous intensity, photon intensity, radiant intensity, SPD, ASRID
DIALux	.uld	n/a	Proprietary file format	Luminous intensity
EULUMDAT	.exl, .ldt	1990, 1998	Open file format, de facto European standard	Luminous intensity
GLDF	.gldf, .xml	v1.0.rc3	Open file format, requires other formats for luminous intensity distribution data (via ZIP), remains in development	Luminous intensity, SPD
LiteStar 4D	.oxl	2015	Open file format in XML	Luminous intensity, SPD
Relux	.rolf	n/a	Proprietary file format	Luminous intensity

== Building information modeling ==
Building information modeling (BIM) involves the generation and management of digital representations of the physical and functional characteristics of buildings or other physical assets and facilities. Some file formats used in BIM can include luminous intensity distribution data but may not specify its format.

- The photometry element of the Green Building XML (gbXML) schema has been left open for use with other specifications (e.g., IES LM-63, CIBSE TM14, EULUMDAT).
- The draft Global Lighting Data Format (GLDF) similarly relies on other specifications via its photometry element.
- In contrast, the Industry Foundation Classes (IFC) allows use of its own format or another specification via its IfcLightDistributionDataSourceSelect element.

== Character encoding ==
Character encoding (the use of a numeric value to digitally represent each character) can differ between file formats. For example, IES LM-63 uses ASCII encoding, while IES TM-33 uses UTF-8 encoding.

== See also ==
- List of lighting design software
