= Beam angle =

Width of the beam of light emitted by a light

Beam angle is a measure of angular width or diameter of the beam of light emitted from products used in architectural lighting, landscape lighting, stage lighting, and other lighting applications. It is known to be an imperfect gauge of perceived beam width. However, the beam angle is for example used to determine the minimum test distance required for acceptable error in photometry.

Several definitions of beam angle are in common use. This article compares them and illustrates how they relate to each other and to related concepts.

== Definitions ==
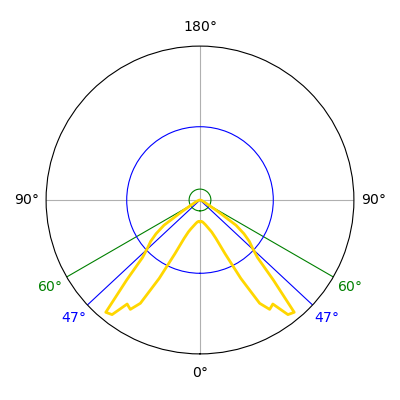
Polar plot of the luminous intensity distribution (yellow) for a luminaire with center-beam intensity much smaller than maximum intensity: beam angle of 94° based on maximum intensity (blue) versus 120° based on center-beam intensity (green)

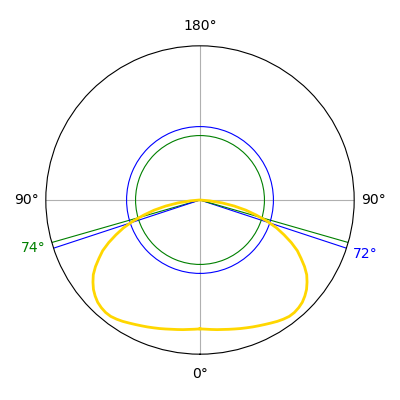
Polar plot of the luminous intensity distribution (yellow) for a luminaire with center-beam intensity smaller than maximum intensity: beam angle of 144° based on maximum intensity (blue) versus 148° based on center-beam intensity (green)

The Illuminating Engineering Society (IES) defines beam angle as the angle between the two directions for which the intensity is 50% of the maximum intensity as measured in a plane containing the nominal beam centerline. By this definition, which is commonly used, the beam angle is the angular full width at half maximum (FWHM). Notably, the term intensity is used here as a shorthand for luminous intensity (not to be confused with luminance or illuminance); beam angle can also be defined in terms of radiant intensity. The intensity distribution data used to determine beam angle is typically measured using a goniophotometer.

The International Commission on Illumination (CIE) uses centre beam intensity, rather than maximum intensity, to define beam angle. Beam angle was defined this way by the National Electrical Manufacturers Association (NEMA) in ANSI C78.379-2006, and this definition was adopted by Energy Star. Although the DesignLights Consortium (DLC) uses center beam intensity to define beam angle in its glossary, it cites the IES definition when specifying technical requirements.

If the direction of maximum intensity is in the center of the beam, there is no difference between beam angle definitions based on maximum intensity or center beam intensity. However, differences can arise if the direction of maximum intensity is not the center of the beam, such as with "batwing" distributions having center beam intensity less than maximum intensity and reflection symmetry or rotational symmetry. If the beam edge is not clearly defined (i.e., no large gradient) and the center-beam intensity is much smaller than the maximum intensity, a beam angle based on maximum intensity can be substantially smaller than a beam angle based on center-beam intensity (see polar plots on this page).

== Related terms and concepts ==
=== Half-value angle ===
CIE defines half-value angle (specifically for light reflected or transmitted from a diffusing surface) as the angle of observation at which the luminance has half the value of the luminance of the diffused light at the angle of 0°, with perpendicular incidence of the light. Notably, this definition uses luminance (rather than luminous intensity), and appears to use the half angle (rather than the full angle).

=== Field angle ===
According to some older definitions, beam angle was measured to 10% of maximum intensity; this wider angle is now termed the field angle.

The floodlight classification system introduced in NEMA publication FL 1-1964 uses Type designations that are defined in terms of field angle ranges.

=== Beam spread and field spread ===
The related term beam spread is often treated as a synonym for field angle. However, it has been defined with different meanings:

- As recently as 1959, IES did not use or define the term field angle, and instead termed this beam spread. It currently defines beam spread as the angle between the two directions in a plane in which the intensity is equal to "a stated percentage" of the maximum intensity, thereby treating beam angle and field angle as kinds of beam spread.
- CIE defines beam spread as the total angle within which the illuminance on a plane normal to the axis of a beam exceeds 10% of the maximum illuminance, but notes that sometimes the beam spread is calculated at 50% of the maximum illuminance.

The American Lighting Association (ALA) Product Data Standard has a data field for beam spread but does not define the term.

The term field spread has been used as a counterpart to beam spread, where the former is based on field angle and the latter is based on beam angle. The CIE and IES glossaries do not contain an entry for field spread. The term is used to establish scope in the IES test methods for searchlights and floodlights but neither document provides a definition.

=== Diffusion angle ===
Beam angle and field angle are specific kinds of what has been termed angle of diffusion or diffusion angle.

=== Beam axis or centerline ===
IES does not define the term beam centerline, but it does define center-beam candlepower (CBCP)—more properly termed center-beam intensity—as the luminous intensity along the geometric centerline of a directional light source, and notes that this definition assumes the centerline intensity is also the maximum intensity.

CIE defines centre beam intensity as the value of the luminous intensity measured on the optical beam axis, and defines optical beam axis as the axis about which the luminous intensity distribution is substantially symmetrical, noting that the optical beam axis does not necessarily correspond to a physical lamp axis. The optical beam axis is along the direction of the centroid of the luminous intensity distribution (analogous to a centroid wavelength), which is determined as a weighted-average direction of emitted luminous flux.

Definitions do not distinguish between the beam axis and the field axis.

=== Symmetry ===
Some intensity distributions do not possess full rotational (circular) symmetry; these may for example have an elliptical cross section.

- IES notes that in such cases, the beam angle (or field angle) is generally given for two planes at 90 degrees, typically the maximum and minimum angles. Each angle value in the pair would correspond to a plane of reflectional symmetry. NEMA Types are often presented in pairs; with the floodlight positioned upright and aimed at the horizon, the first number is for the angle in a horizontal plane and the second number is for the angle in a vertical plane, where the intersection of planes is the nominal beam centerline.
- Energy Star, citing ANSI C78.379-2006, defines the beam angle as the angle between the two opposite directions in which the average intensity is 50% of the center beam intensity as measured in at least two perpendicular planes (resulting in a single angle value).

== See also ==
- Radiometry – Measurement of electromagnetic radiation (esp. optical radiation)
