= LDT =

LDT may stand for:

- Laterodorsal tegmental nucleus, a nucleus in the brain stem
- Laboratory developed test, in vitro diagnostics
- Labordatentransfer, a German xDT format to transfer laboratory tests
- Large deviations theory, field of probability theory
- Learning Design and Technology, an academic program
- Lexical decision task in psychology experiments
- Lightning Data Transport, later HyperTransport computer bus
- Local Descriptor Table, an x86 data structure
- Telbivudine or LdT, a drug for hepatitis B
- Computer file extension for EULUMDAT
