= Photometry =

Photometry can refer to:

- Photometry (optics), the science of measurement of visible light in terms of its perceived brightness to human vision
- Photometry (astronomy), the measurement of the flux or intensity of an astronomical object's electromagnetic radiation
- A photometric study, sometimes also referred to as a lighting "layout" or "point by point"

== See also ==
- Photogrammetry
- Radiometry
