= Floodlight =

High-intensity electric light with a broad beam

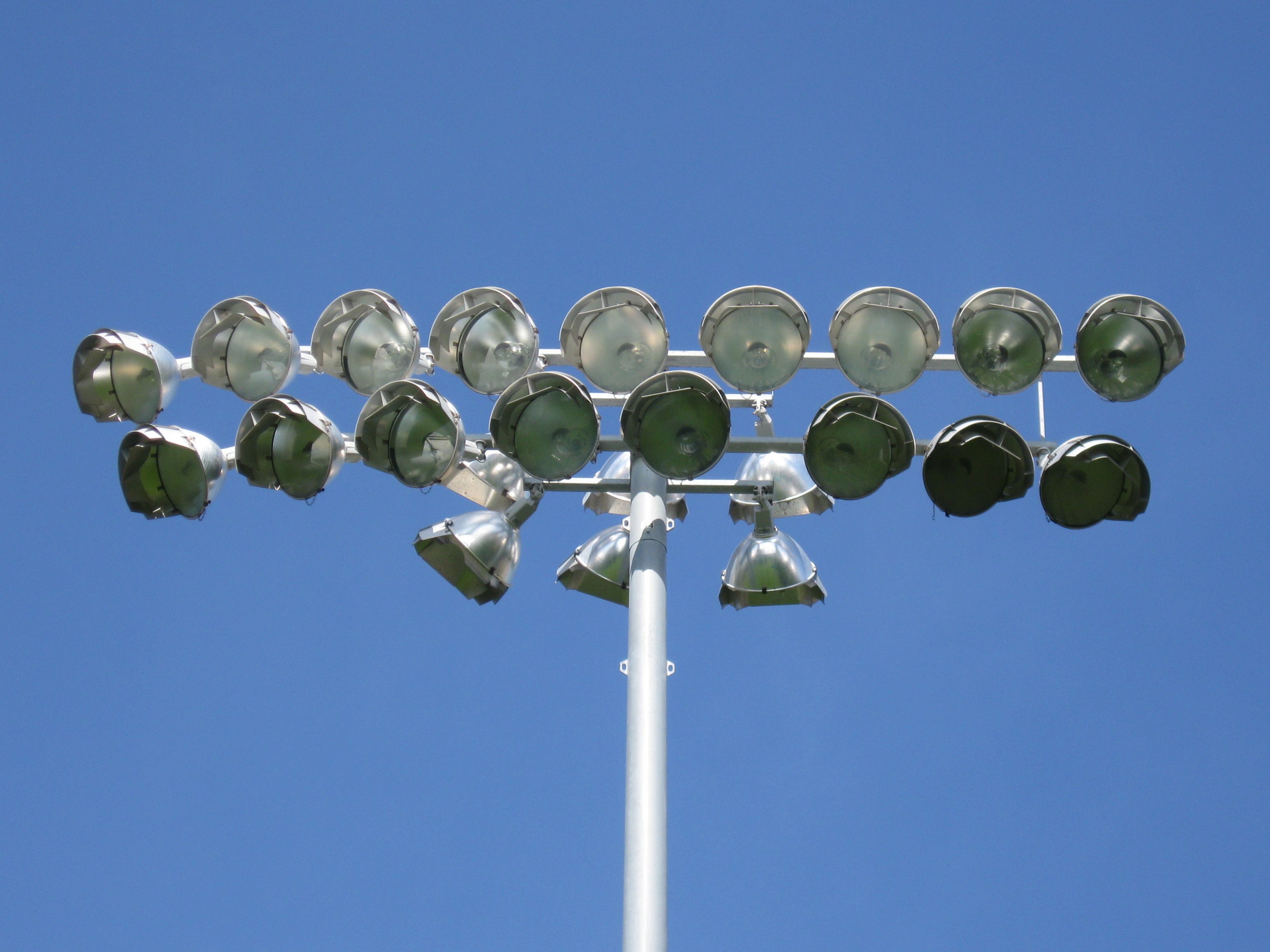
Floodlights

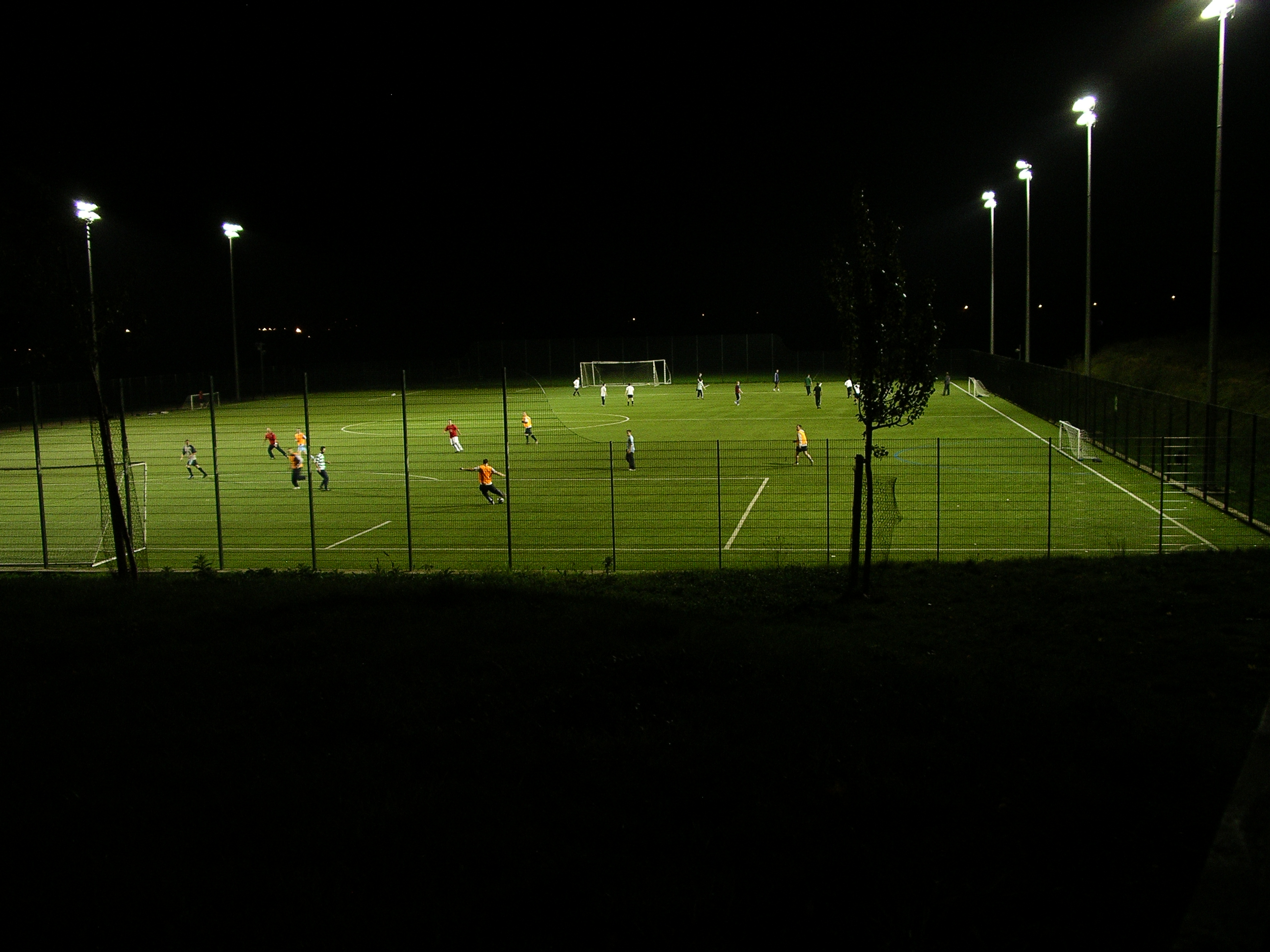
Association football pitch at a sports center illuminated with floodlights.

A floodlight is a broad-beamed, high-intensity artificial light. It can provide functional area lighting for travel-ways, parking, entrances, work areas, and sporting venues to enable visibility adequate for safe task performance, ornamental lighting for advertising, façades, monuments, or support perimeter security. Floodlights are often used to illuminate outdoor playing fields while an outdoor sports event is being held during low-light conditions. More focused kinds are often used as a stage lighting instrument in live performances such as concerts and plays.

Floodlights may also be used to add effects to buildings at night; this is commonly termed facade lighting or—less precisely—architectural illumination.

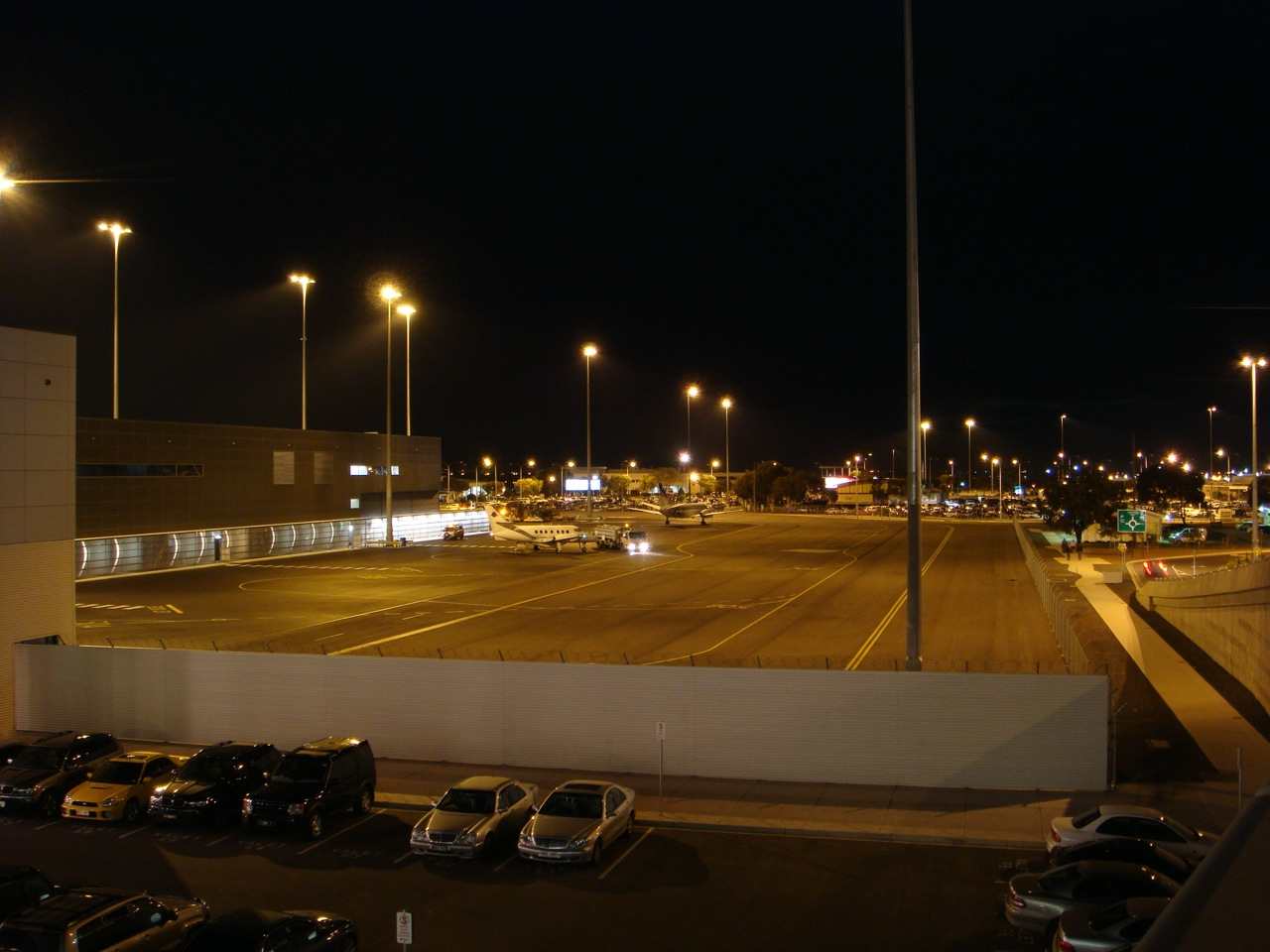
Floodlights at Adelaide Airport.

== Light source technologies ==
Prior to the emergence of white-light LEDs, the most common type of light source used in sports floodlights was the metal-halide lamp. Sodium-vapor lamps were also commonly used for sporting events, due to their higher luminous efficacy. These have been largely replaced by LED floodlights.

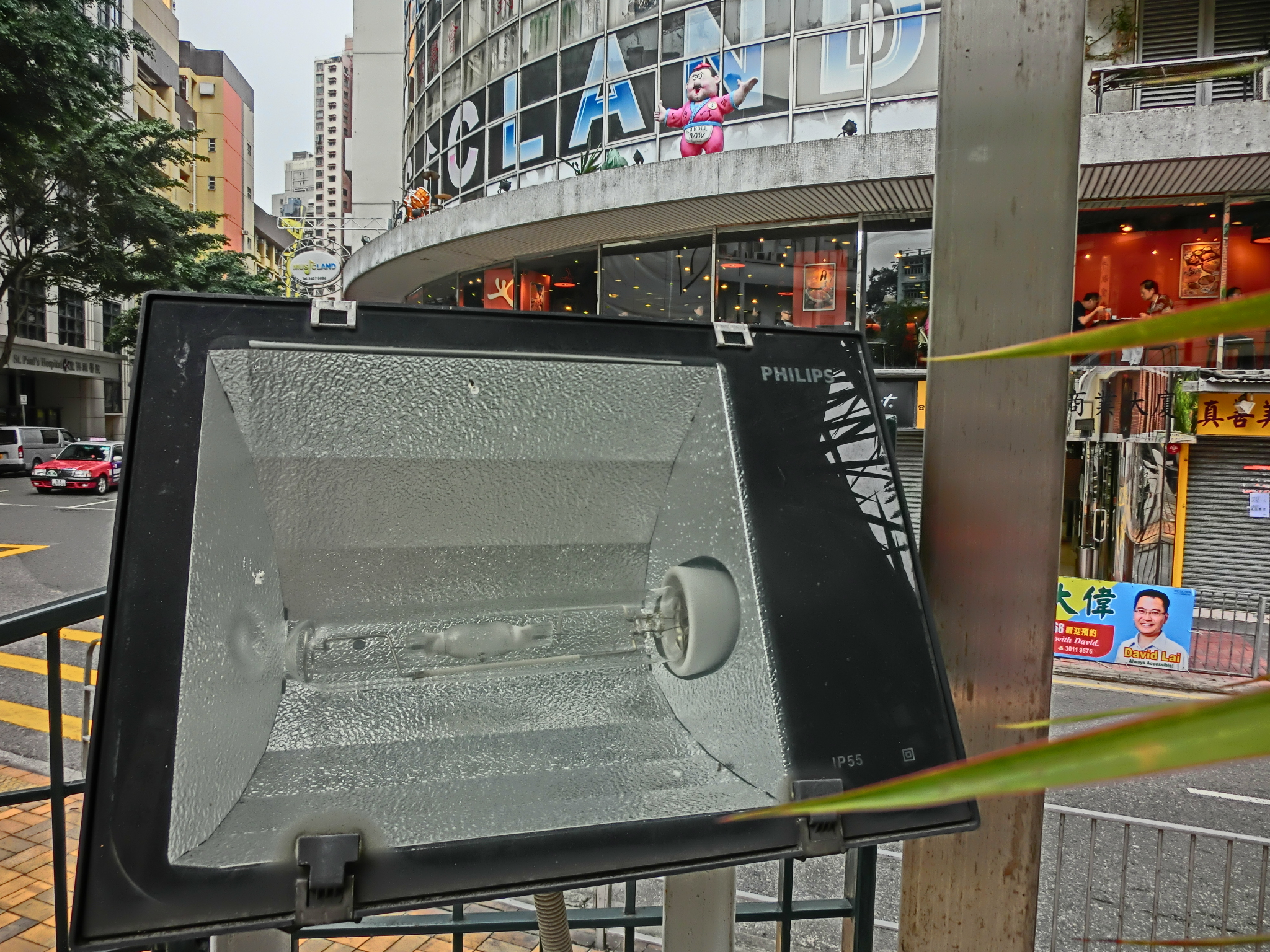
Metal halide floodlight

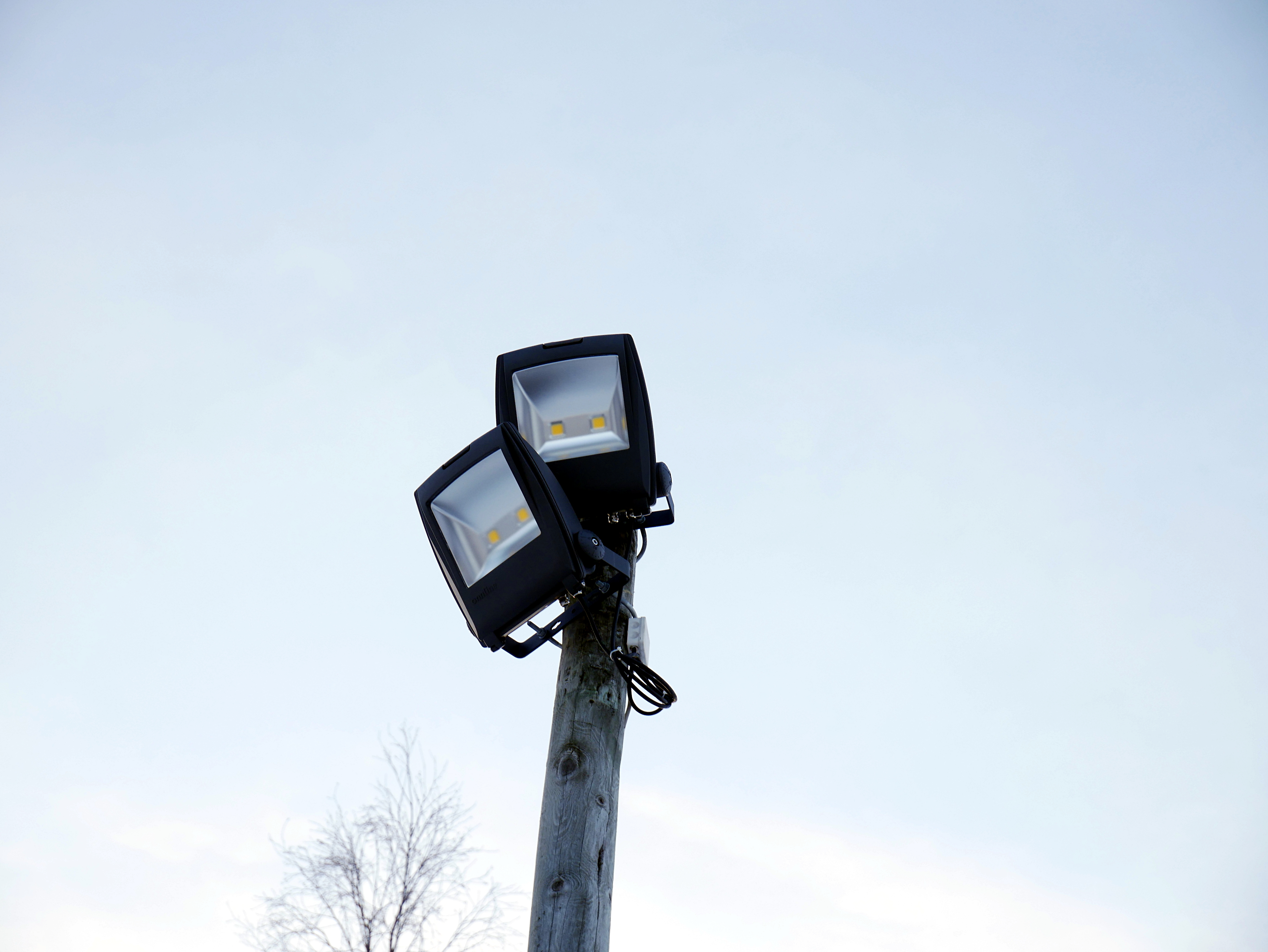
LED floodlights

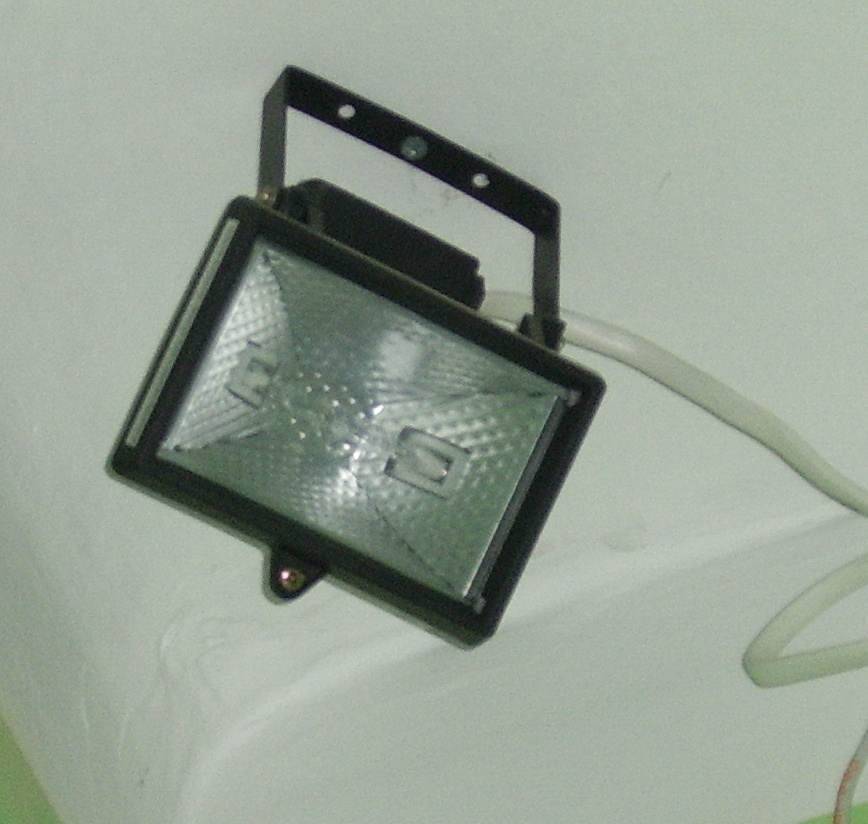
Halogen floodlight

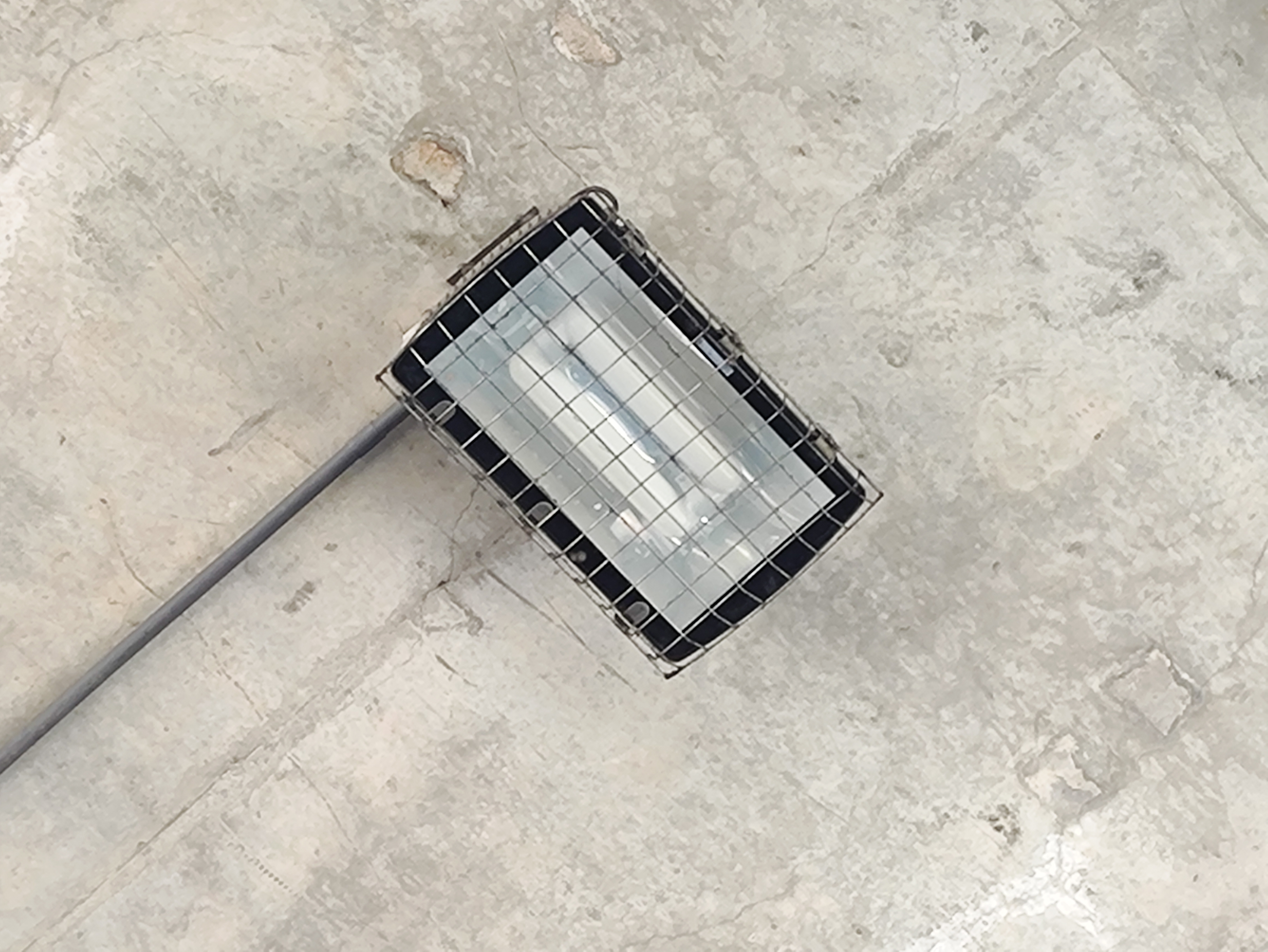
Electrodeless induction floodlight

LED floodlights are bright enough to be used for illumination purposes on large sport fields. The main advantages of LEDs in this application are their lower power consumption, longer life, and instant start-up (the lack of a "warm-up" period reduces game delays after power outages). They have replaced many metal halide floodlights. Halogen and electrodeless induction floodlights also exist.

The first LED lit sports field in the United Kingdom was switched on at Taunton Vale Sports Club on 6 September 2014.

== Luminous intensity distribution ==
In the United States, the luminous intensity distribution of a floodlight (measured using a goniophotometer) is commonly described using the National Electrical Manufacturers Association (NEMA) "Type" designations shown in Table 1. A floodlight's NEMA Type is determined based on its field angle, which is defined by the Illuminating Engineering Society (IES) as the angle between the two directions for which the intensity is 10% of the maximum intensity as measured in a plane containing the nominal beam centerline.

Table 1. NEMA floodlight designations
NEMA Type	Field angle range
1	10° ≤ field angle ≤ 18°
2	18° < field angle ≤ 29°
3	29° < field angle ≤ 46°
4	46° < field angle ≤ 70°
5	70° < field angle ≤ 100°
6	100° < field angle ≤ 130°
7	130° < field angle

Since at least as far back as 1958, a field angle smaller than 10° (sometimes designated NEMA Type 0) has resulted in classification as a searchlight.

When the current version of the floodlight classification system was first introduced, in NEMA publication FL 1-1964, the field angle was termed beam spread. Field angle had become the favored term by 1972. Notably:

- IES currently treats field angle and the related term beam angle as different kinds of beam spread; it does not consider beam spread to be a synonym for beam angle.
- Luminous intensity should not be confused with illuminance, which is used to determine a different kind of beam spread defined by the International Commission on Illumination (CIE). The page for photometry illustrates the difference between luminous intensity and illuminance.

Some intensity distributions do not possess full rotational (circular) symmetry; these may for example have an elliptical cross section. In such cases, NEMA Types are often presented in pairs. With the floodlight positioned upright and aimed at the horizon, the first number is for the angle in a horizontal plane and the second number is for the angle in a vertical plane, where the intersection of planes is the nominal beam centerline. For example, a floodlight with field angles of 80° horizontal and 40° vertical could be described as NEMA Type 5H x 3V.

== Sports played under floodlights ==
In the top tiers of many professional sports, it is a requirement for stadiums to have floodlights to allow games to be scheduled outside daylight hours. Evening or night matches may suit spectators who have work or other commitments earlier in the day, and enable television broadcasts during lucrative primetime hours. Some sports grounds which do not have permanent floodlights installed may make use of portable temporary ones instead. Many larger floodlights (see bottom picture) will have gantries for bulb changing and maintenance. These will usually be able to accommodate one or two maintenance workers.

=== Polo ===
The first sport to play under floodlights was polo, on 18 July 1878. Ranelagh Club hosted a match in Fulham, London, England against the Hurlingham Club.

=== Australian rules football ===
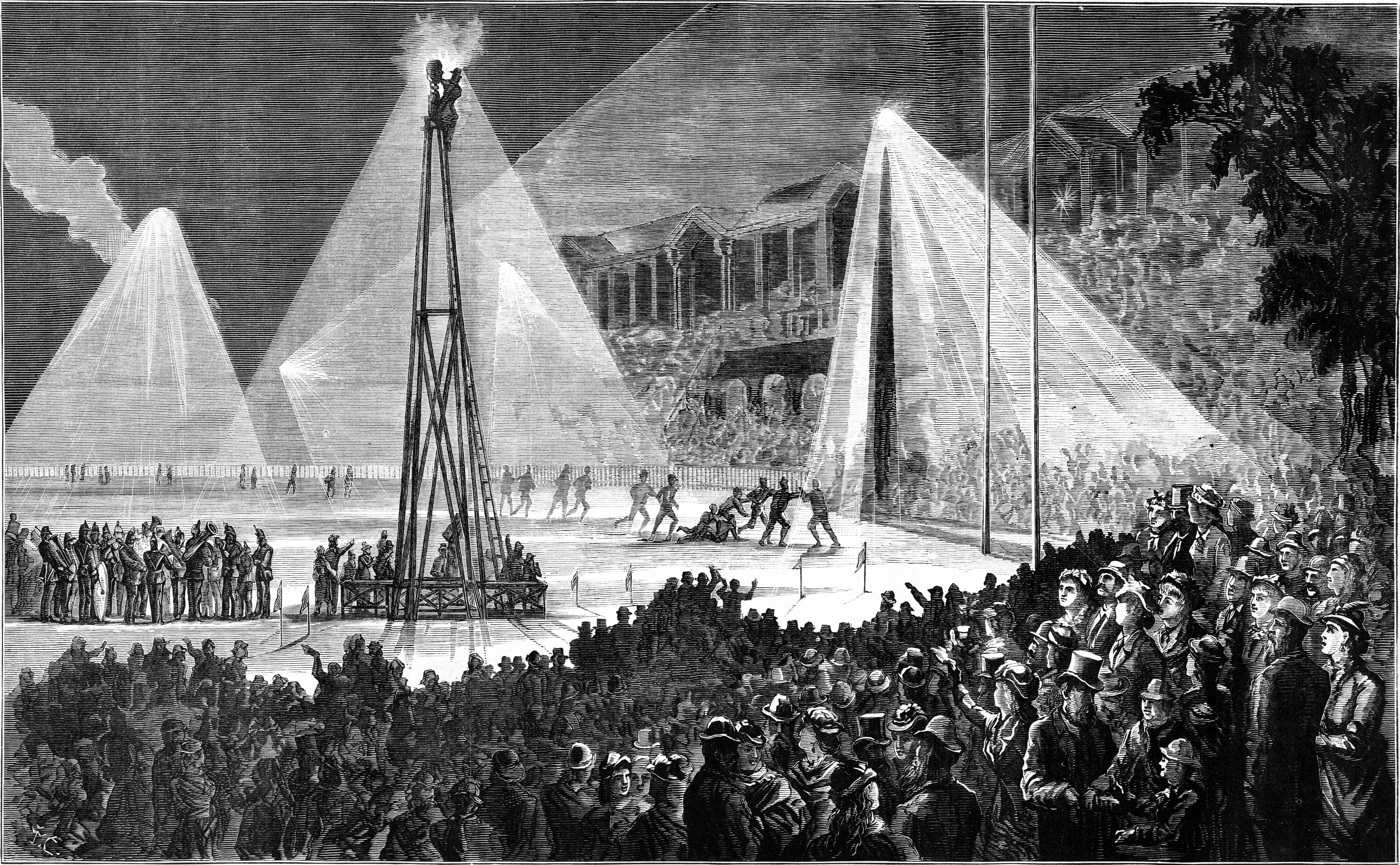
Australian rules football match under electric lights at the Melbourne Cricket Ground, 1879

In August 1879, two matches of Australian rules football were staged at the Melbourne Cricket Ground under electric lights. The first was between two "scratch" teams composed of military personnel. The following week, two of the city's leading football clubs, rivals Carlton and Melbourne, played another night match. On both occasions, the lights failed to illuminate the whole ground, and the spectators struggled to make sense of the action in the murky conditions.

=== Cricket ===
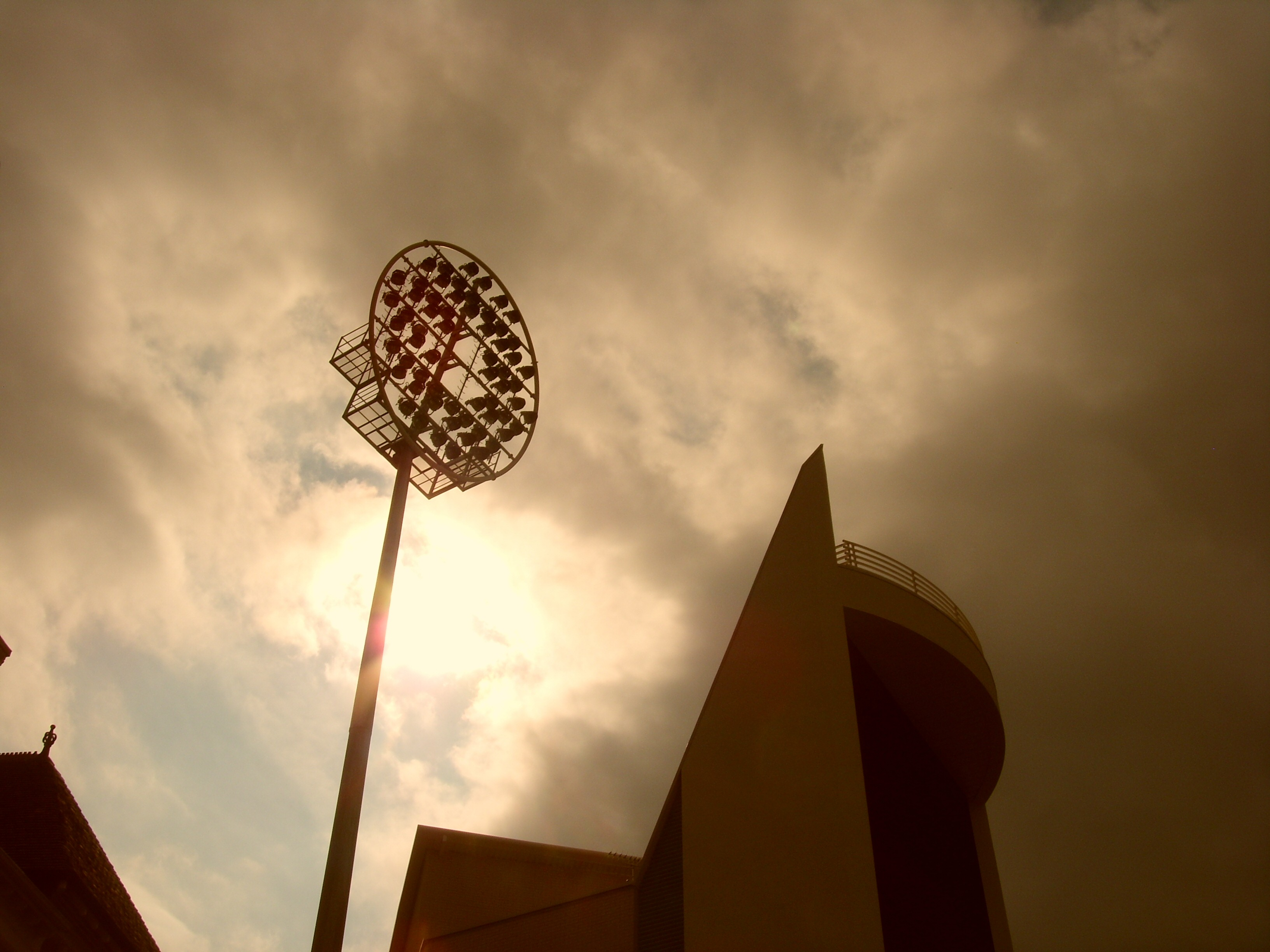
A floodlight at Trent Bridge cricket ground in Nottingham

Cricket was first played under floodlights on 11 August 1952, during an exhibition game at Highbury stadium in England. International day/night cricket, played under floodlights, began in 1979. Since then, many cricket stadiums have installed floodlights and use them for both domestic and international matches. Traditional cricket floodlights are mounted at the top of a tall pole, to elevate them out of the fielder's eyeline when the ball is hit high into the air. However, some cricket stadiums have lower-mounted floodlights, particularly if the stadium is shared with other sports.

=== Gaelic games ===
Noel Walsh's advocacy was pivotal in the spread of floodlights in Gaelic games. When chairman of the Munster Council, Walsh had a pilot project for floodlights at Austin Stack Park in Tralee which "became a template for every county and club ground in the country".

=== Association football ===
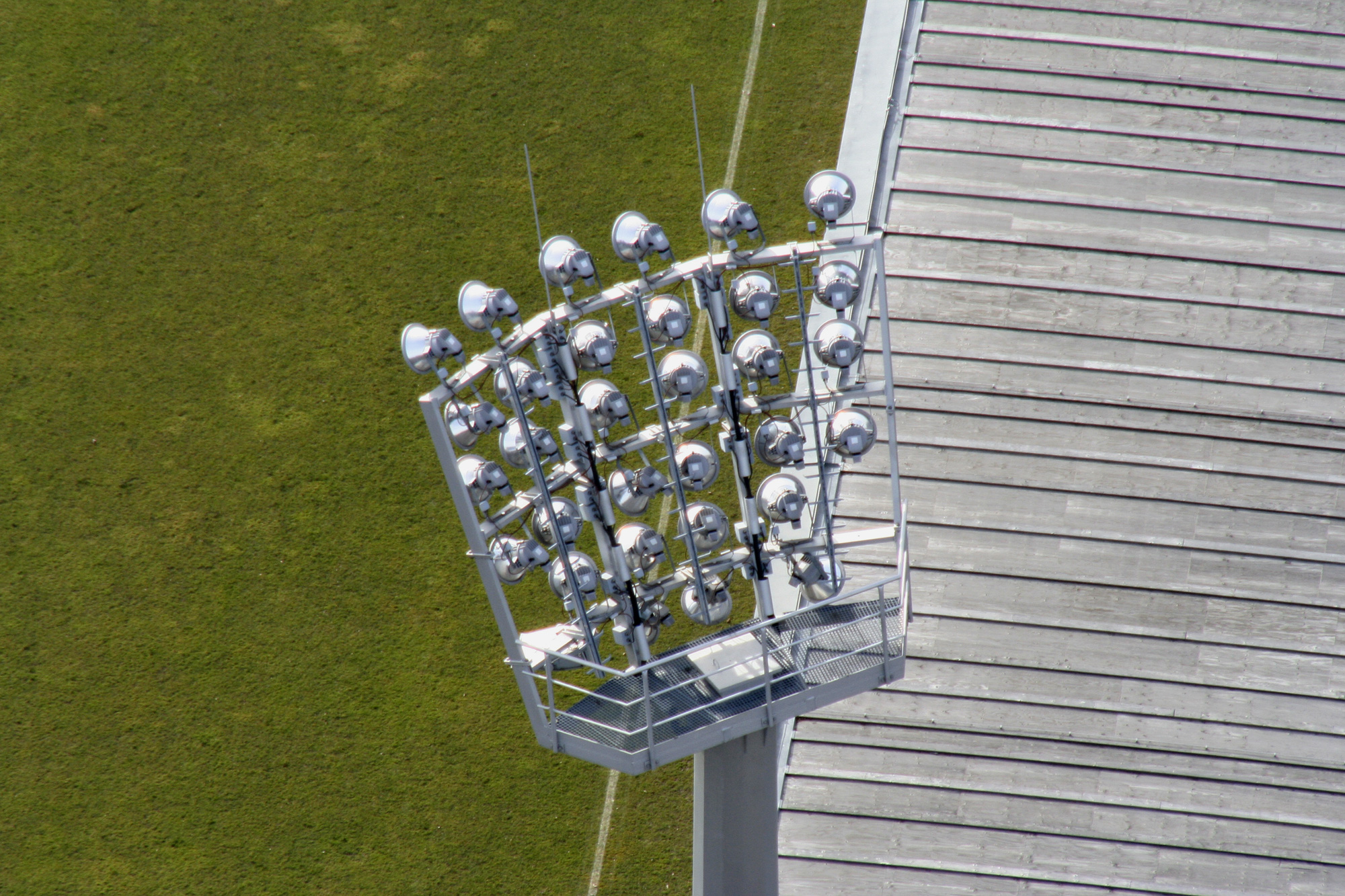
A floodlight used on a football field

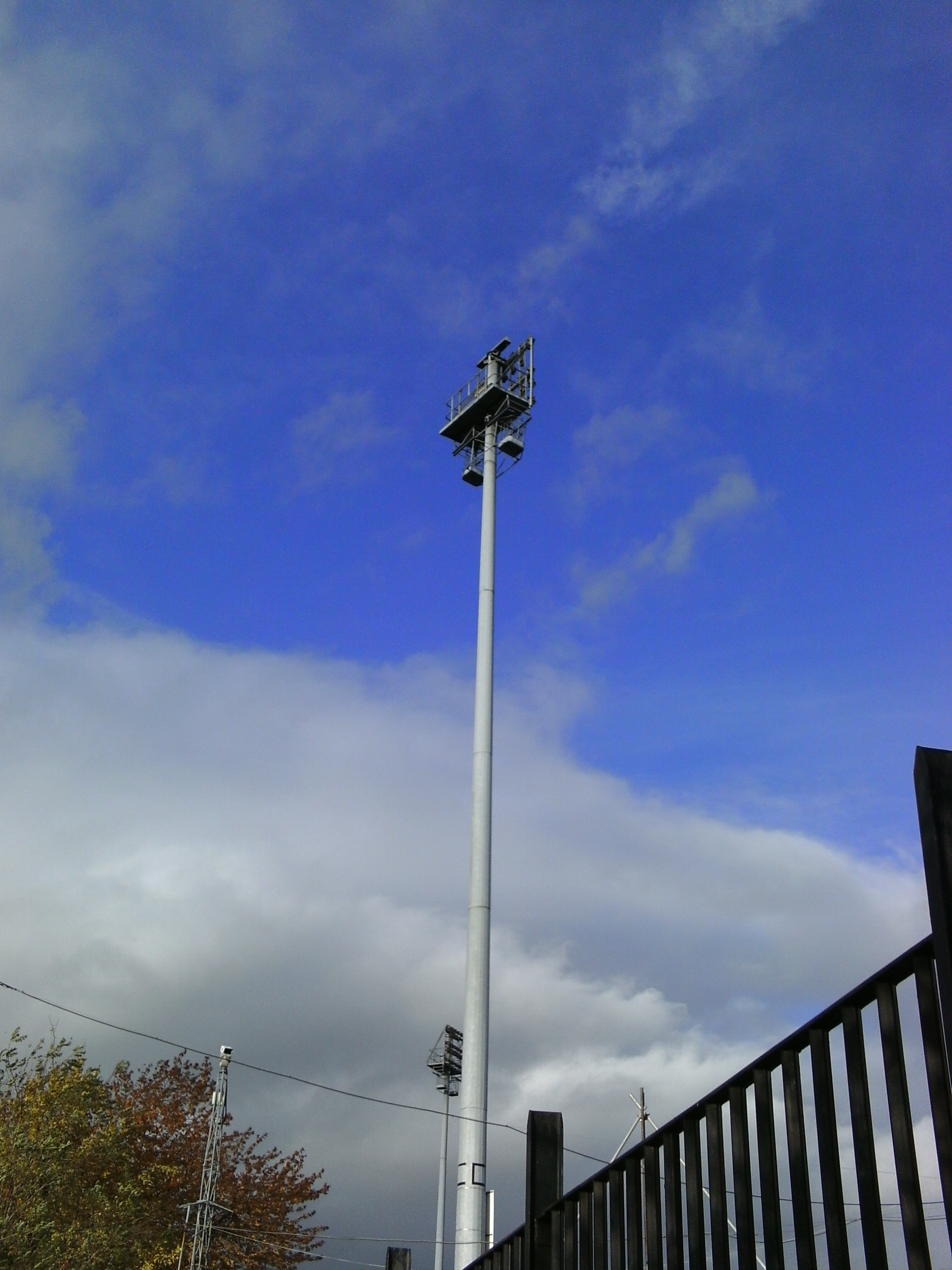
Floodlights on a Rugby league field at the Headingley Stadium in Leeds, UK. This is a common style of floodlights at older football and rugby grounds in England and Scotland. (Note the two gantries near the light for servicing)

Bramall Lane was the first stadium to host floodlit association football matches, dating as far back as 1878, when there were experimental matches at the Sheffield stadium during the dark winter afternoons. With no national grid, lights were powered by batteries and dynamoes, and were unreliable. Blackburn and Darwen also hosted floodlit matches in 1878, and in October of the same year 3rd Lanark RV played an exhibition match against Scottish Cup holders Vale of Leven at the first Cathkin Park, with press reports suggesting the lighting from a Gramme machine was not successful in illuminating the whole field. Subsequent tests over the next month using three Siemens dynamos at the first Hampden Park, Rugby Park in Kilmarnock and at Powderhall Stadium in Edinburgh produced mixed results, in part due to technical issues and weather conditions.

Nottingham Forest played a floodlit match against Notts Rangers at the Gregory Ground, Lenton, Nottingham on 25 March 1889. This match was illuminated by 14 Wells Lights which was a portable illumation system powered by paraffin Each light had 4,000 candlepower. These lights were placed around the ground and 'illuminated the playing arena well enough for the spectators to follow most, if not all, the points of play' according to the Nottingham Evening Post on 26 March 1889. However the same article also reported on 26 March 1889 that 'a strong wind was blowing from the Radford goal, and this caused the lights on the town side to shed a considerable portion of their radiance on the adjoining fields, so that dark shadows were often thrown upon the playing ground and it was almost impossible to see a case of handling unless the officials were close to'. The match was played at 7:45pm and Forest lost 2-0 watched by 5000 spectators.

Thames Ironworks (who would later be re-formed as West Ham United) played a number of friendly matches under artificial light at their Hermit Road ground during their inaugural season of 1895–96. These experiments, which included high-profile fixtures against Arsenal and West Bromwich Albion, were set up using engineers and equipment from the Thames Ironworks and Shipbuilding Company.

A women's football match in 1921 used floodlights, when Preston North End's ground was covered in thick fog and the spectators couldn't see the game.

In 1929 the Providence Clamdiggers football club hosted the Bethlehem Steel "under the rays of powerful flood lights, an innovation in soccer" at their Providence, Rhode Island stadium. On 10 May 1933, Sunderland A.F.C. played a friendly match in Paris against RC Paris under floodlights. The floodlights were fixed to overhead wires strung above and across the pitch. A fresh white coloured ball was introduced after about every 20 minutes and the goalposts were painted yellow.

In the 1930s, Herbert Chapman installed lights into the new West Stand at Highbury but the Football League refused to sanction their use. This situation lasted until the 1950s, when the popularity of floodlit friendlies became such that the League relented. In September 1949, South Liverpool's Holly Park ground hosted the first game in England under "permanent" floodlights: a friendly against a Nigerian XI. In 1950, Southampton's stadium, The Dell, became the first ground in England to have permanent floodlighting installed. The first game played under the lights there was on 31 October 1950, in a friendly against Bournemouth & Boscombe Athletic, followed a year later by the first "official" match under floodlights, a Football Combination (reserve team) match against Tottenham Hotspur on 1 October 1951. Swindon Town became the first League side to install floodlights at The County Ground. Their first match being a friendly against Bristol City on Monday 2 April 1951. Arsenal followed five months later with the first match under the Highbury lights taking place on Wednesday 19 September 1951. The first international game under floodlights of an England game at Wembley was 30 November 1955 against Spain, England winning 4–1. The first floodlit Football League match took place at Fratton Park, Portsmouth on 22 February 1956 between Portsmouth and Newcastle United.

Many clubs have taken their floodlights down and replaced them with new ones along the roof line of the stands. This previously had not been possible as many grounds comprised open terraces and roof lines on covered stands were too low. Elland Road, Old Trafford and Anfield were the first major grounds to do this in the early 1990s. Deepdale, The Galpharm Stadium and the JJB Stadium have since been built with traditional floodlights on pylons.

=== Rugby league ===
The first rugby league match to be played under floodlights was on 14 December 1932 when Wigan met Leeds in an exhibition match played at White City Stadium in London (8pm kick off). Leeds won 18–9 in front of a crowd of over 10,000 spectators. The venture was such a success that the owners of the White City Ground took over the "Wigan Highfield" club and moved them to play Rugby League games at the ground under floodlights the following season, with most of their matches kicking off on Wednesday Nights at 8pm. That venture only lasted one season before the club moved back up north.

The first floodlit match for rugby league played in the heartlands was on 31 October 1951 at Odsal Stadium, Bradford when Bradford Northern played New Zealand in front of 29,072.

For a club to play in the Super League they must have a ground with floodlights adequate for playing a professional game.

=== Winter sports ===
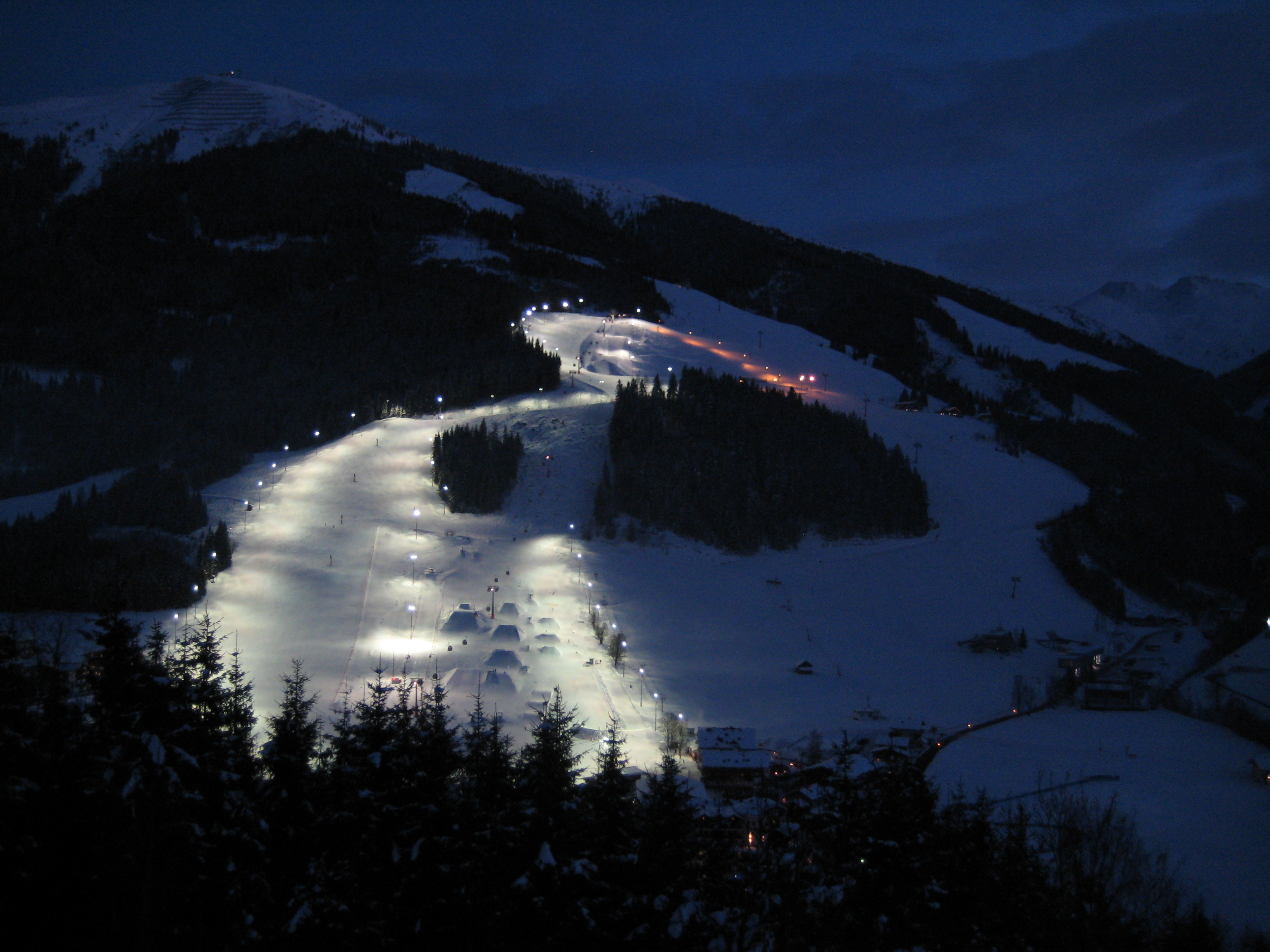
A floodlit piste in Schattberg, Austria

Winter sports, such as skiing and snowboarding, can be held on a floodlit piste.

=== Motorsports ===
A number of permanent motor racing circuits are floodlit to allow night races to be held.

== See also ==
- Street light
- Searchlight
- Vehicle Headlamp
- Aircraft Landing lights
- Light pollution
