= Pendant light =

Type of hanging lamp

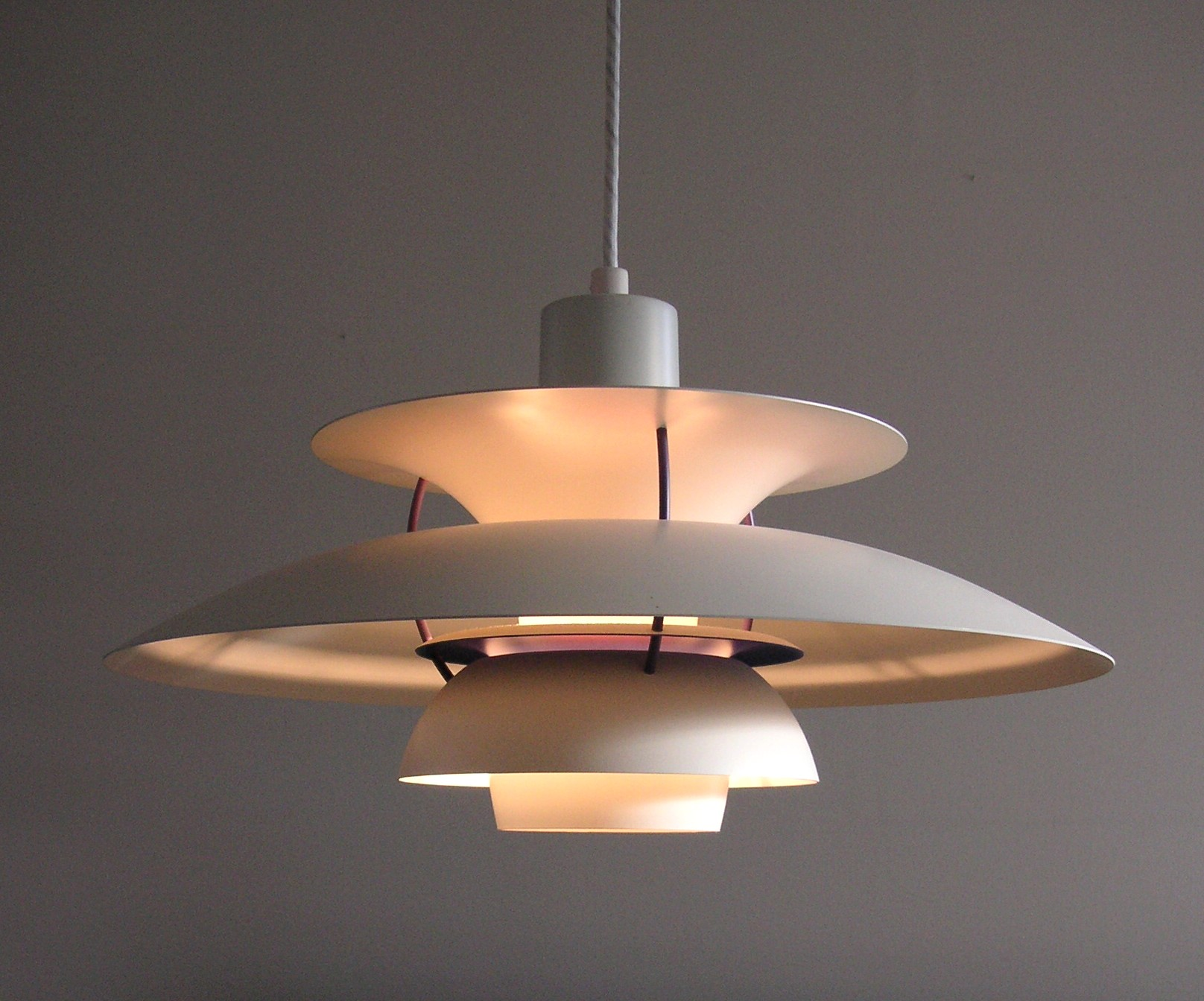
Poul Henningsen, PH Lamp, 1927: pendant lamp whereby the light was emitted indirectly.

A pendant light is a light fixture that hangs from the ceiling, typically suspended by a cord, chain, or metal rod. Unlike chandeliers, pendant lights have a single light source, though they are often installed in multiples. Common applications include rows over kitchen countertops, dining areas, and bathroom vanities. Pendants come in a huge variety of sizes and vary widely in materials from metal to glass or concrete and plastic.

Contemporary designs often incorporate energy-efficient technologies such as low-voltage LEDs, halogen lamps, or fluorescent bulbs.

A billiard or linear pendant is a longer type of pendant fixture, usually with fluorescent tubes, or multiple incandescent bulbs or LED lights. They are commonly used over kitchen islands, dining tables, or billiard tables. They are sometimes classified as a type of chandelier.

Pendant lighting is considered an important element in architectural lighting design and for interior design.

== Positioning ==
Pendant lights are commonly installed over kitchen countertops, in dining rooms, hallways, and stairwells.

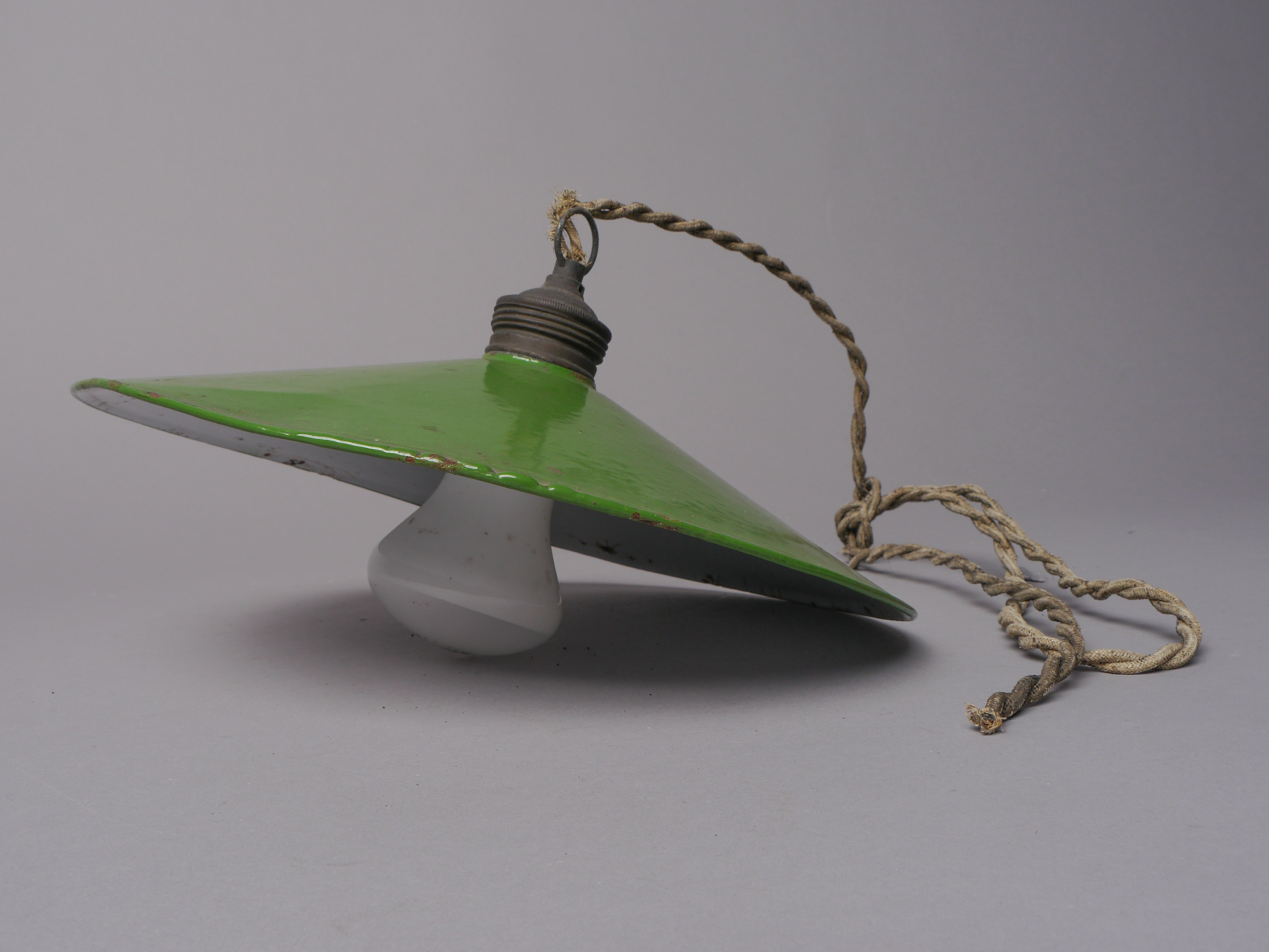
Enamelled pendant lamp with round lampshade - Collection Museum of Industry Ghent

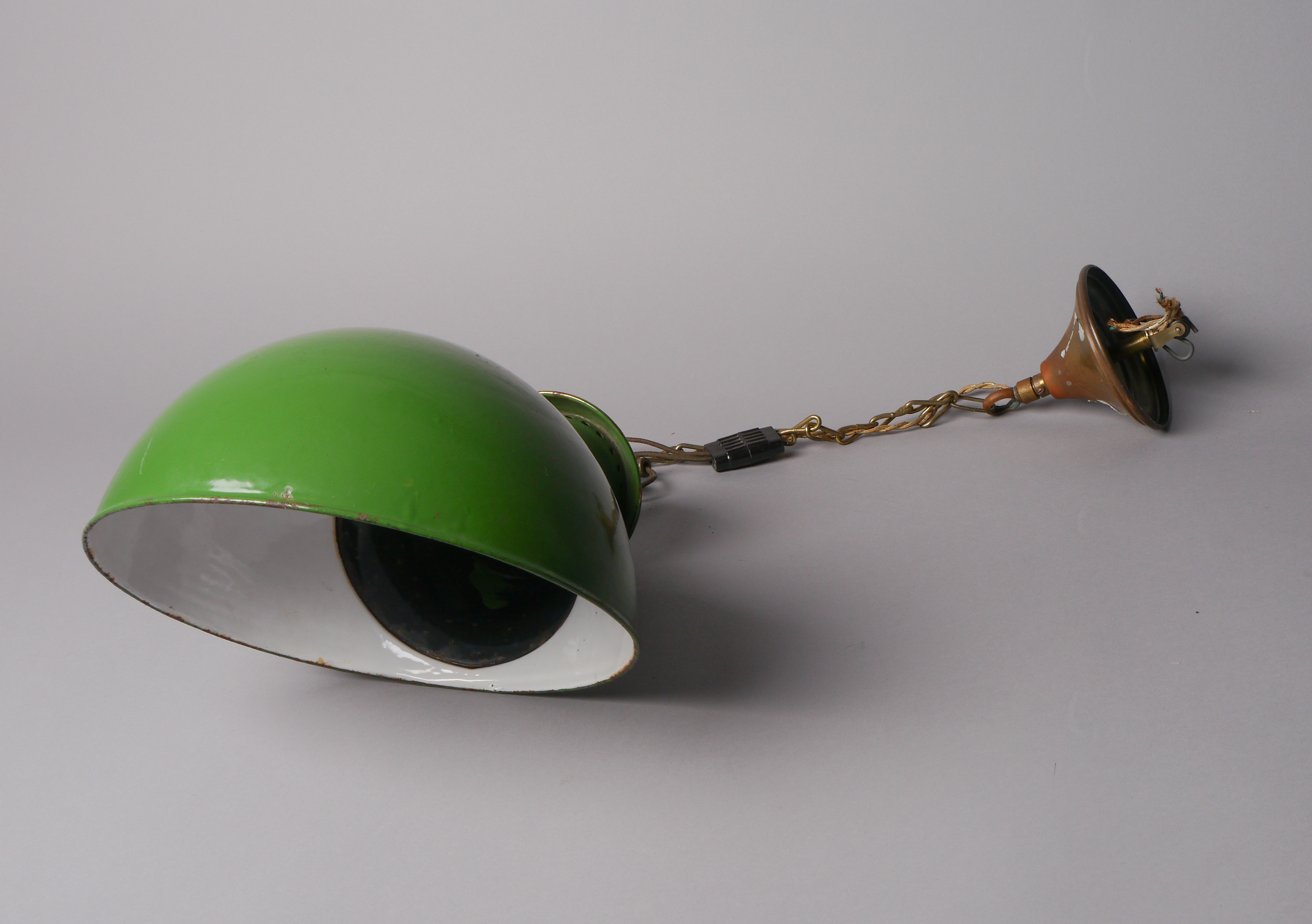
Enamelled pendant lamp with spherical lampshade - Collection Museum of Industry Ghent

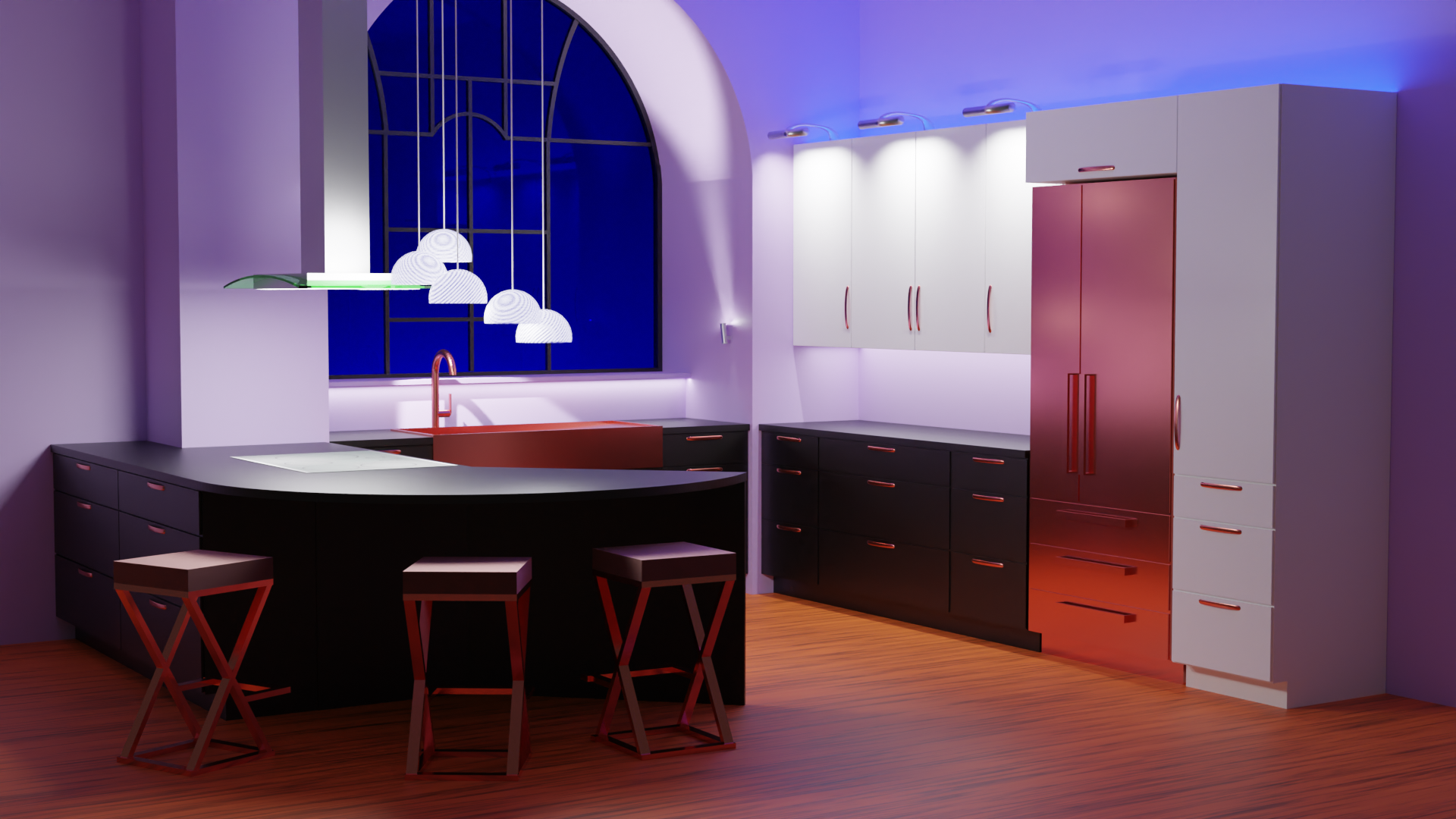
Illustration with five pendant lights hanging over a kitchen island

== See also ==
- Drop light
