= Goniophotometry =

Goniophotometry or goniometric optical scatter measurement is the technique of measuring the angular distribution of light, possibly wavelength-dependent, scattered from a surface.

Goniophotometry involves the use of a goniophotometer to measure intensity distributions from lamps and luminaries and to evaluate the gloss of paints and other surface finishes.
