= Sustainable lighting =

Lighting designed with energy efficient light source

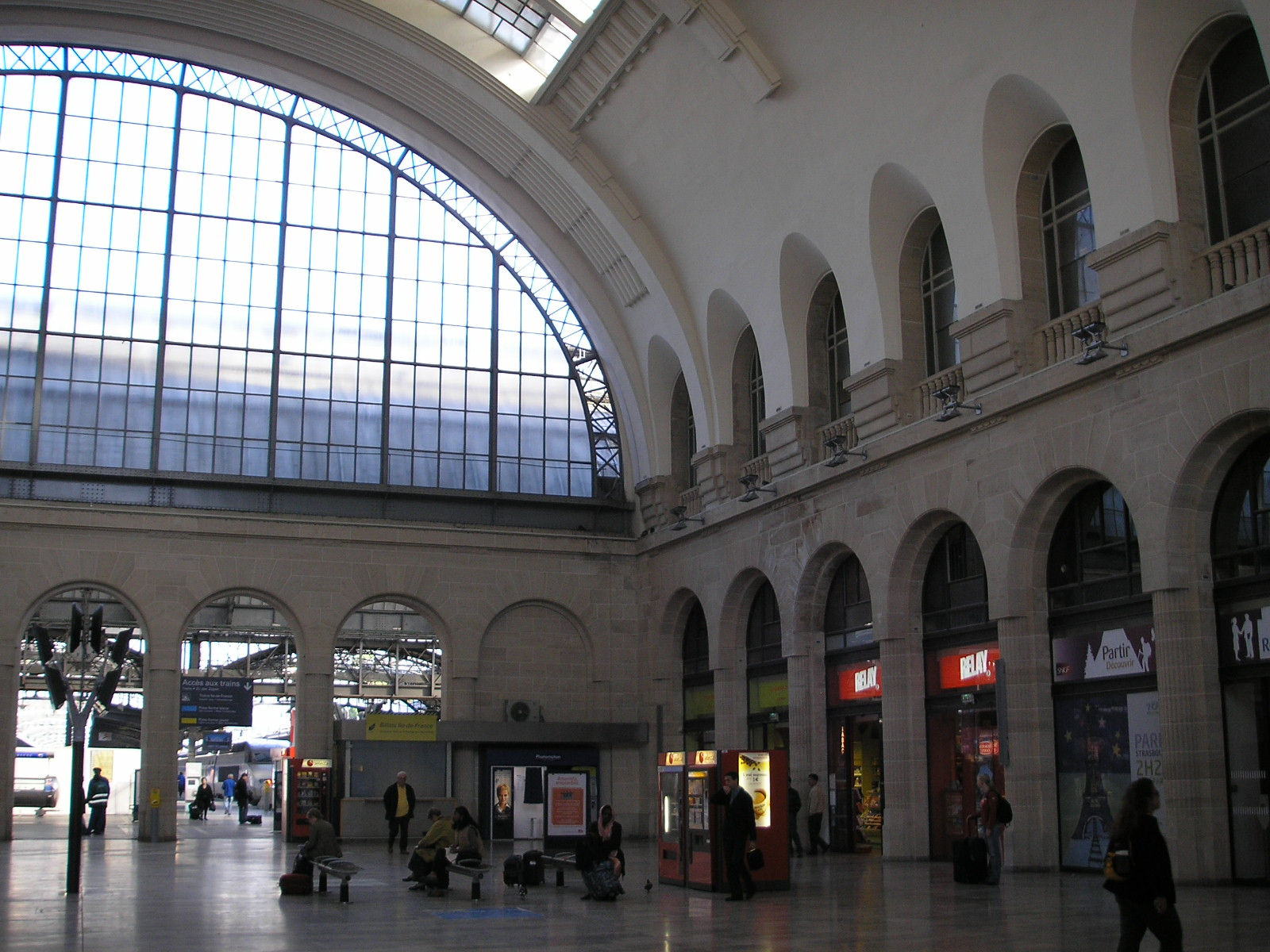
Daylight used at the train station Gare de l'Est Paris

Sustainable lighting is lighting designed with energy efficient light sources. "There are simple design strategies and some materials that can facilitate the energy saving advantages of natural light. Light colored interiors and open floor plans are good choices. This approach also augments artificial light efficiency. Energy efficient lighting is not simply finding the most light for the least wattage or the longest lasting light bulb. Proper sizing of the light to the needs of the location and the tasks that will be performed, called task lighting, is an energy saving strategy."

"The most sustainable source of lighting is daylight, other forms are solar lamps harvesting daylight and lighting controlled by occupation sensors. Furthermore technologies such as light-emitting diodes can be used to drastically reduce the energy requirement for energy. Part L of the UK lighting regulations contains criteria that effects efficient lighting design.

Both day lighting and electric lighting are used in architectural lighting design, and not just as something installed to enable people to see their task. Satisfaction surveys indicate that people prefer rooms that are day lit to interiors dominated by electric lighting. In addition, the use of daylight can significantly reduce a building's use of energy. Post-occupancy research indicated that the success of a scheme in reducing energy is not determined solely by the quantity of light from windows, but also on the efficiency and control of the electric lighting and that the users of the building were motivated towards energy management.

In cloudy climates, diffuse light from the sky is the main source of lighting. At the site planning stage, a sufficient area of sky must be made visible to give good interior lighting.

People’s needs and preferences to sunlight dependent on the type of building – incoming sunlight can give warmth and brightness but can also cause glare and thermal discomfort. The designer must to analyses the clients’ requirements in advance to determine which parts of a building would benefit from direct sunlight. Once the day lighting has been assessed, electric lighting needs to be designed to complement the daylight; where necessary electric light will take over when the daylight fades. Zones can be considered relative to the daylight distribution – without this there will be a tendency for the lights to be in all the time. Electric lighting can also be integrated within the architecture. Daylight and the aesthetics can be considered as well as the installation into the buildings fabric and lighting effect.
