= Lumen method =

Simplified light level calculation

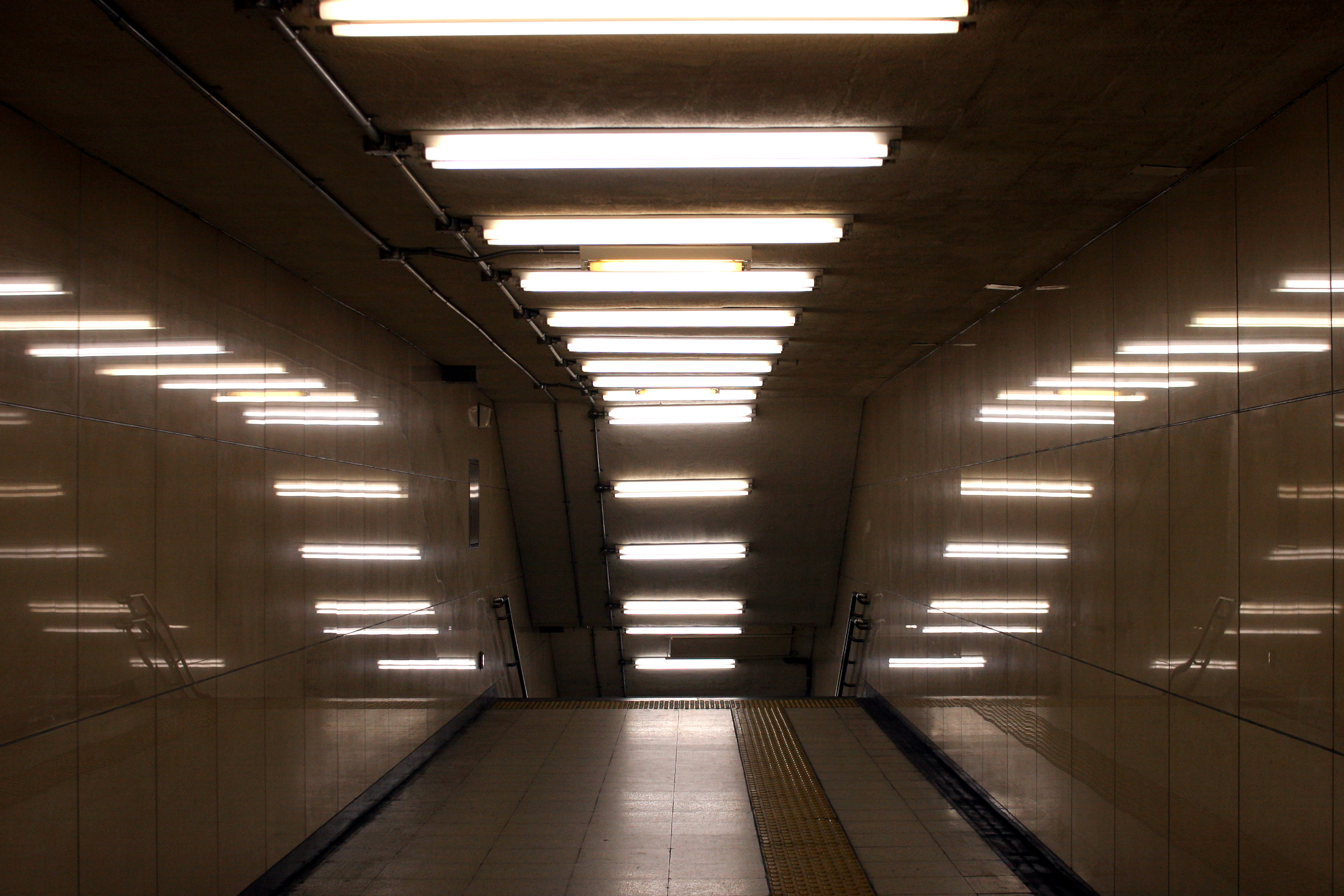
Fluorescent lamps

In lighting design, the lumen method, (also called zonal cavity method), is a simplified method to calculate the light level in a room. The method is a series of calculations that uses horizontal illuminance criteria to establish a uniform luminaire layout in a space. In its simplest form, the lumen method is merely the total number of lumens available in a room divided by the area of the room. In order to perform this calculation, many factors, coefficients, lamp lumen data and other quantities must be gathered. Despite the scientific impression of the lumen method equations, there are inaccuracies and assumptions built into the method. Therefore, the lumen method should not typically be used as a standalone, final solution; it should be used as a tool in particularly uniform settings of lighting design if a simple, rough technique of illuminance quantification is desired.

== Light loss factors ==
Light loss factors (LLF) are the factors that need to be considered when calculating the Lumen Method. The most important factors to be considered are:

1. Lamp Lumen Depreciation (LLD): Lamp lumen depreciation values reflect the overall performance of a lamp over its life. LLD = (mean lumens/rated lumens) Those values can be found from the lamp manufacturer data
2. Ballast Factor (BF): Compares the ratio of light output of a lamp working by a specific ballast to the light output of the same lamp working by a standard reference ballast. The BF is given in the ballast manufacturer data.
3. Luminaire Dirt Depreciation (LDD): It is the light loss prior to cleaning dust. LDD is estimated from tables in IESNA Lighting handbook.
4. Room Surface Dirt Depreciation (RSDD): This value accounts for dirt or dust that accumulates on all of the room surfaces — especially on the upper walls and ceiling. RSDD is also estimated from handbook tables.

The product of all these factors is the light loss factor (LLF) which then is used in the Average Illuminance equation.

== Method ==
A step-by-step guide is given in textbooks and the IESNA Lighting Handbook.

The lumen method in brief consists of calculation of the "cavity ratios" of the upper, middle, and lower volumes of the space to be lighted. The lower cavity is from the floor to the working height, the upper cavity is from the lower edge of the luminaires to the ceiling, and the middle cavity is the volume between these planes.

The effective reflectance of ceiling, floor, and walls are estimated from tabular data. A coefficient of utilization, representing the fraction of light that is directed to the working plane, is supplied by manufacturers for each luminaire design for the various calculated room cavity ratios.

Some of the light produced by the lamps is lost due to non-ideal lamp operating conditions, dirt on the luminaires, dirt on the room surfaces. A light loss factor is calculated for all these, based on tabulated empirical factors.

Given the usual lighting problem of obtaining an average lighting level at the working plane, the number of luminaires can be calculated based on the effective amount of useful light that each luminaire has been calculated to emit.

Since the zonal cavity method only gives an average lighting level, manufacturers tabulate recommended spacing to mounting height ratios that must not be exceeded if uniform illumination is desired.

== Usage ==
The lumen method can be manipulated to solve for a particular variable. This is valuable because certain numbers are needed at different times in the design process. “Number of luminaires” is important because this number can be used to estimate costs and layout the spacing of luminaires in a computer lighting calculation program (Steffy 2002).

== Variables ==
The CU value should be obtained by the manufacturer of the luminaire which is to be evaluated. In order to determine the CU on the manufacturer's table, a room cavity ratio (RCR) must be used. Also, the reflectance of the ceiling, walls and floor must be known.

RCR = 5 x (room height) x (room width + room length) / [(room width) x (room length)]

Lumens per lamp should be obtained from the lamp manufacturer.

Light loss factors can be calculated using methods in the IESNA handbook. Sometimes, individual companies have their own rule of thumb for Light Loss Factors. The ballast factor can be obtained from the ballast manufacturer.
