= Richard Kelly (lighting designer) =

American lighting designer (1910–1977)

Richard Kelly (1910–1977) was an American lighting designer, considered one of the pioneers of architectural lighting design. Kelly had already established his own New York-based lighting practice in 1935 before enrolling at the Yale School of Architecture. He graduated from there in 1944. Kelly characterized the difficulty in selling lighting consultancy, then a new discipline, when he reflected, "There weren't lighting consultants then. Nobody would pay for my ideas, but they would buy fixtures."

By the 1950s, his work in lighting design led him to coin the terms 'focal glow', 'ambient luminescence' and 'play of brilliants' to describe particular effects in lighting design, namely that of highlighting objects, washing surfaces, and creating sharp detail, respectively. His later career also saw him lecture at Yale, Princeton, and Harvard University.

After his death, the Illuminating Engineering Society of North America established the Richard Kelly Grant in his name to encourage creativity in lighting among young people.

== Biography ==
Richard Kelly initially developed interest in lighting design through theatrical stage lighting at Columbia University where he was involved in the school's theater department. Despite majoring in science and literature, he took many architecture classes and designed light fixtures for a local manufacture in his free time. After graduating in 1932, Kelly opened his own office to design and sell lighting equipment. He spent the next decade working with architects and designers on projects across a variety of sectors.

During this time, European glass became adopted in the states, resulting in development of new illumination technology that required understanding of modern architecture. Combined with World War II restricting his design work and a desire to be respected in the architecture community, he enrolled in Yale University's School of Architecture, graduating in 1944 with a bachelor's degree. During his studies, Kelly met and collaborated heavily with famous stage and lighting designer Stanley McCandless that shared similar interests. Together, they pushed to implement the principles of modern theater in both stagecraft and architectural lighting design.

Shortly after graduating from Yale, Kelly completed more than 30 commercial projects in six years, working with architects such as Richard Neutra, Phillip Johnson, and Mies van der Rohe. He would go on to 300 major projects throughout his career, being a major influence in the developing field of architectural lighting.

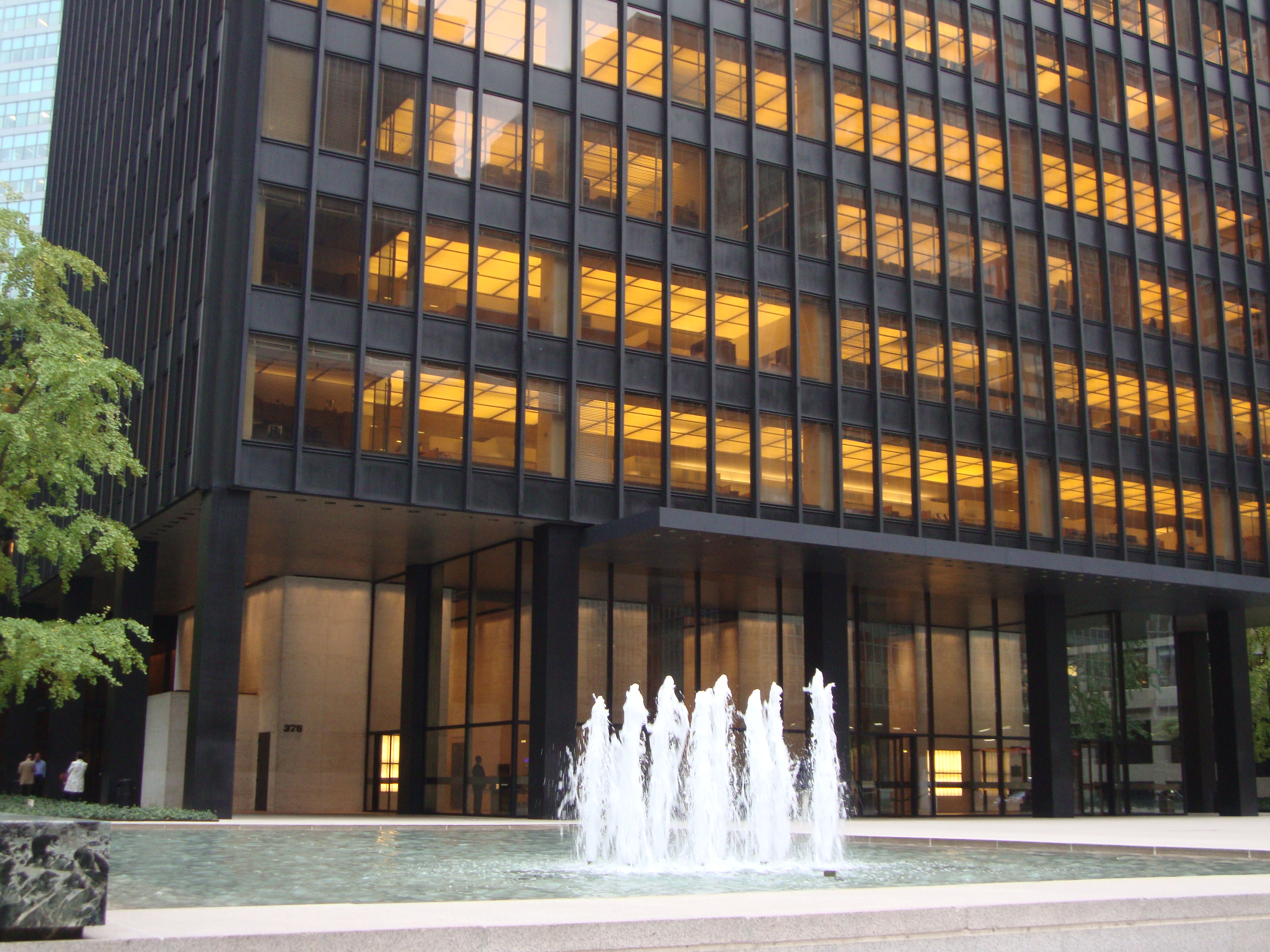
Seagram building (1958) with architectural lightning design by Kelly

In 1964, he was awarded the Collaborative Achievement Award by the American Institute of Architecture for his work on Seagram Building and the building's Four Seasons Restaurant. In 1967, he was awarded a Gold Medal for his contributions on "light in architecture."

Kelly passed away in 1977 at the age of 66 from a heart attack. Two years later in 1979, a group of members from New York's Chapter of Illuminating Engineering Society founded a scholarship under Kelly's name, the Richard Kelly Memorial Scholarship, to support young emerging lighting design professionals. After substantial fundraising efforts, the scholarship awarded its first recipient in 1985. As of 2025, the scholarship continues to award one new recipient on a yearly basis (with some exceptions).

== Methodology ==
Richard Kelly famously quotes “Space is nothing until interrupted. Light is invisible until interrupted by a surface, line, or point, thus made visible.” He believed that the intention behind architectural forms are revealed mostly through the eyes so how the form visually appears is of great importance. Taking inspiration from his mentor Stanley McCandless's lighting theories, he defined three major lighting effects that can influence how an object is visualized:

=== Ambient luminescence ===
Kelly described ambient luminescence to be "the uninterrupted light of a snowy morning in the open country, fog light at sea in a small boat, twilight haze on a river where shore and water and sky are indistinguishable." This layer serves as the foundation, ensuring all objects are visible while producing little shadows and reducing the importance of its subjects.

=== Focal glow ===
Kelly defined focal glow as a light that "draws attention, pulls together diverse parts, sells merchandise, separates the important from the unimportant, helps people see." The goal of focal glow is to guide the viewer's attention through contrast with ambient luminescence. While ambient light aims to equally light all objects, focal glow purposely emphasizes and differentiates certain objects. This is most commonly achieved through a directional light with a higher luminance than the ambient light.

=== Play of brilliants ===
The final effect is defined by Kelly to "excites the optic nerve and in turn stimulates the body and spirit, quickens the appetite, awakens curiosity, sharpens the wit, and is distracting or entertaining as it is used and desired." While the first two effects are meant to serve other objects, play of brilliants is meant to be viewed by itself. This effect can be achieved through colors, refractions, reflections, and a multitude of techniques in modern lighting design.

== Notable projects ==
Richard Kelly's most notable projects saw him collaborate with architects including Mies van der Rohe, Philip Johnson, Eero Saarinen, and Louis Kahn. Such lighting projects include:

- David H. Koch Theater (then the New York State Theater)
- Glass House
- Kimbell Art Museum
- Seagram Building
- Flamengo Park
