= Goniophotometer =

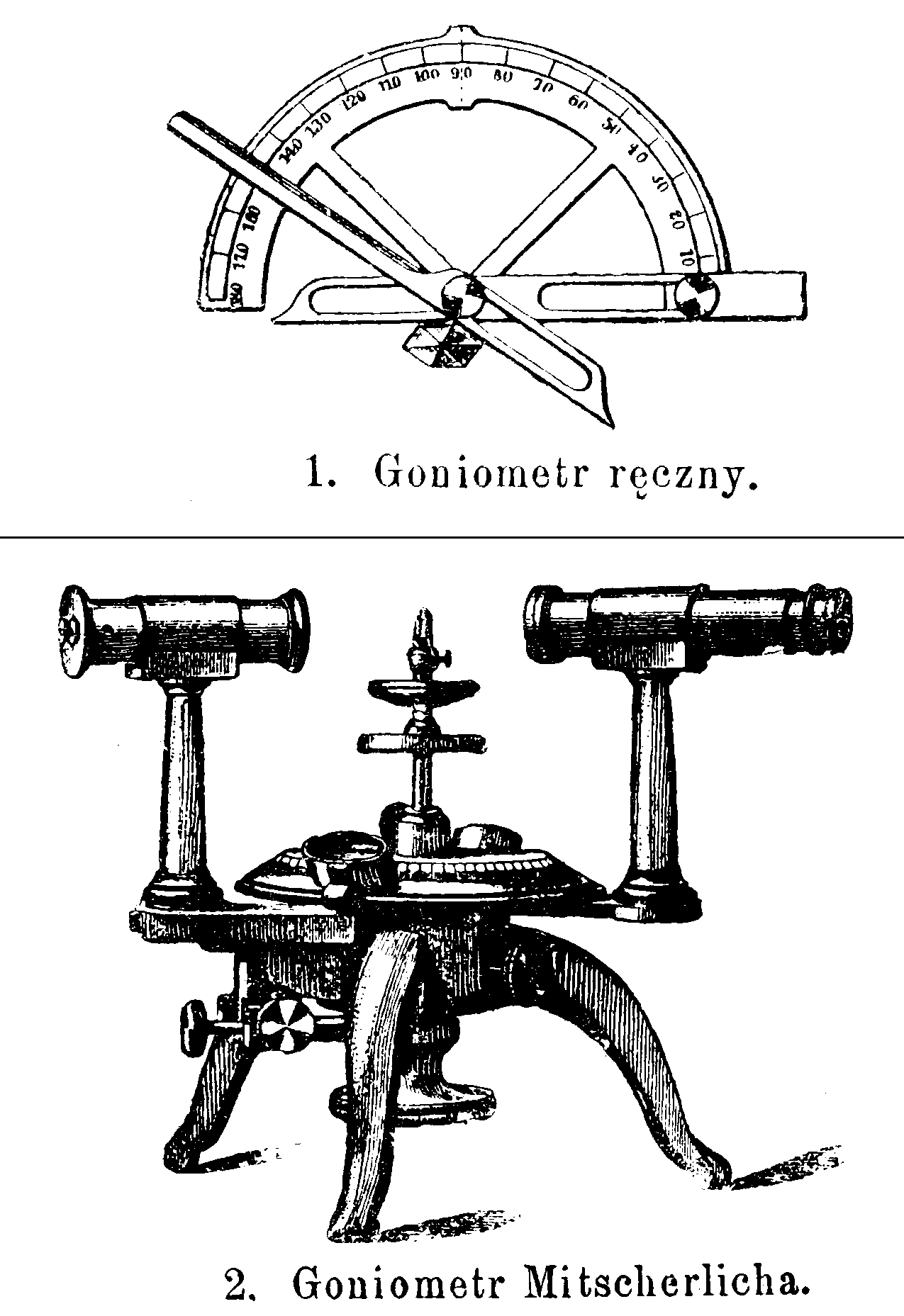
Manual (1), and Mitscherlich's optical (2) goniometers for use in crystallography, c. 1900

A goniophotometer is a photometer for measuring the directional light distribution characteristics of light sources, luminaires, optical media, and surfaces. A goniophotometer typically incorporates a goniometer that measures direction using spherical coordinates to capture the angular distribution of the transmitted, emitted, or reflected light. A gonioradiometer differs only in that it is a radiometer (i.e., is not specific to human vision), rather than a photometer.

A goniophotometer enables characterization of emitted light that is not isotropic. The directional distribution of light is of high importance to architectural lighting, automotive lighting, and other applications. It is typically referred to as the luminous intensity distribution when expressed in terms of angular coordinates. It is sometimes referred to as the beam pattern, but this term can also refer to the pattern of light displayed on a surface normal to the beam axis.

== Uses ==
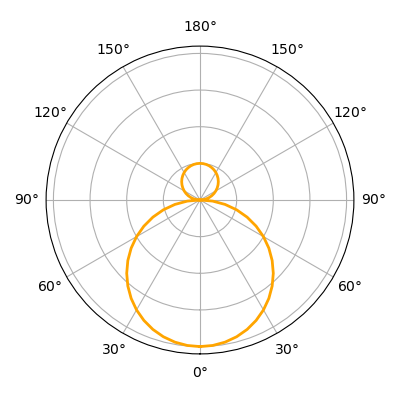
Polar plot of the luminous intensity distribution for a luminaire with Lambertian downlight (80%) and uplight (20%)

A goniophotometer can be used for various applications:

- Measurement of luminous flux of a light source
- Measurement of luminous intensity distribution from a source much smaller than the size of the goniophotometer

Equipped with color sensors additional characteristics can be measured

- Distribution of correlated color temperature
- Color uniformity

A goniophotometer can also be used to determine an indicatrix of diffusion or scattering indicatrix, which is a representation in space, in the form of a surface expressed in polar coordinates, of the angular distribution of (relative) radiant intensity or luminous intensity or of (relative) radiance or luminance of an element of the surface of a medium that diffuses an incident beam of optical radiation by reflection or transmission.

== Types ==
The goniophotometer types A, B, and C defined here are derived from publication CIE 070-1987 of the International Commission on Illumination. Use of goniophometers is further detailed in CIE 084-1989 and CIE 121-1996. The Illuminating Engineering Society offers similar definitions and guidance in ANSI/IES LM-75-19.

=== Type A ===
Fixed horizontal axis, with the vertical axis attached, both perpendicular to the main output direction of the light source

=== Type B ===
Fixed vertical axis, with the horizontal axis attached, both perpendicular to the main output direction of the light source

Type A and B are Double columns structure. This type is applied to fixed the grille lamp. The symmetry axis of lamp and the horizontal of rotating supporter is coaxial, in the B-βcoordinate system, and the two is vertical Cross, in the A-αcoordinate system.

=== Type C ===
Fixed vertical axis perpendicular to the line of measurement, with a horizontal axis parallel to the main output direction of the light source

Type C are single column structures. The single column structure is created when the assistant column is taken down from double columns structure. This type is applied to a fixed tube lamp, spot lamp, or other devices. The axis radiation of lamp and the horizontal of rotating supporter is coaxial.

=== Camera-based goniophotometers ===
Luminous intensity distributions can also be measured using imaging goniophotometers. In order to measure the full angular distribution of a light source, the fisheye camera method can be used. The method is based on employing a fisheye-lens camera installed into a port of an integrating sphere. The camera simultaneously records the luminous intensity data for all angles of light emission, reducing the measurement uncertainty due to temporal effects, such as drift and temporal modulation of the light source. The instantaneous nature of the camera measurement also significantly reduces the time required to obtain the luminous intensity distribution of the device under test, and is not affected by the angular resolution set for the measurement.

== See also ==
- EULUMDAT – Data file format
- Goniometer – Angle measuring instrument
- Goniophotometry
- Integrating sphere – Optical component
- List of file formats for luminaire radiometric data
