= Centroid wavelength =

Power-weighted mean wavelength

The centroid wavelength is the power-weighted mean wavelength:

$$\lambda_\text{c} = \frac{1}{P_\text{total}} \int p(\lambda) \lambda\, d\lambda,$$

and the total power is

$$P_\text{total} = \int p(\lambda) \,d\lambda,$$

where $p(\lambda)$ is the power spectral density, for example in W/nm.

The above integrals theoretically extend over the entire spectrum, however, it is usually sufficient to perform the integral over the spectrum where the spectral density $p(\lambda)$ is higher than a fraction of its maximum.

== See also ==
- Dominant wavelength
