= EULUMDAT =

Data file format

- Filename extension: .ldt
- Developed by: Axel Stockmar (Light Consult Inc.)
- Initial release: 1990; 36 years ago
- Latest release: 2; 1998; 28 years ago

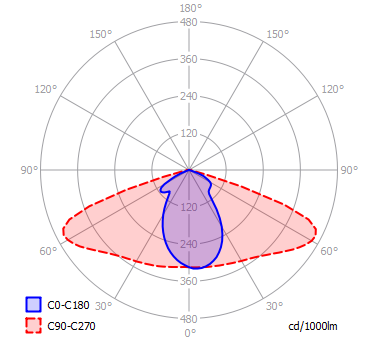
Example of an EULUMDAT diagram, generated by the software QLumEdit 1.0.1

EULUMDAT is a data file format used for specification of photometric data especially intensity distributions from light sources such as lamps and luminaries. The file extension is .ldt. The format was proposed by Axel Stockmar (Light Consult Inc., Berlin) in 1990. The format is the European equivalent to the IES file format specified in IESNA LM-63. The data in an EULUMDAT file is usually measured using a goniophotometer. The IES file format is more formally specified and many measuring instruments support both formats of file.

== Software ==
EULUMDAT files can be read with Photometry.
