= Architectural lighting design =

Field within architecture, interior design and electrical engineering

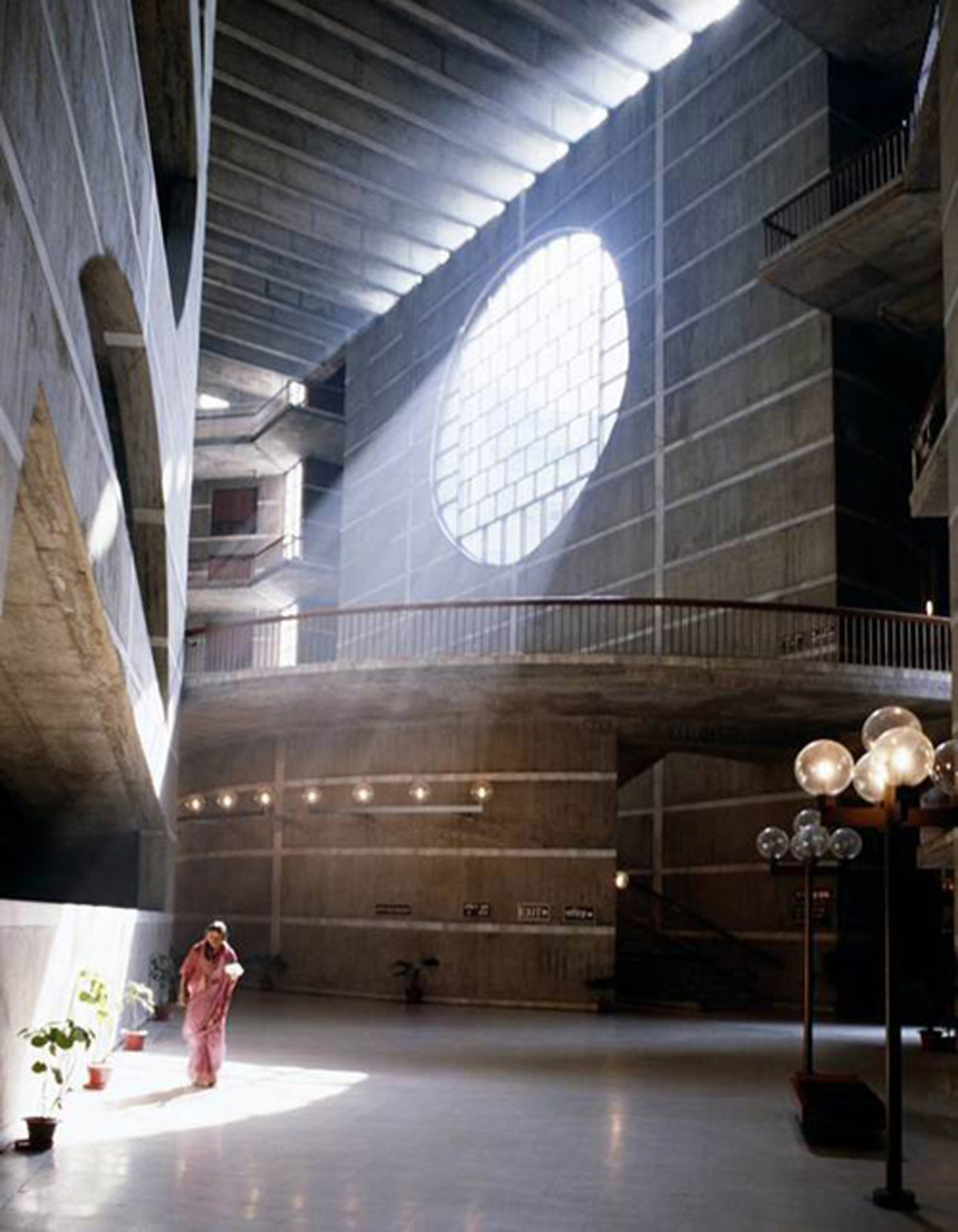
Play of light inside Jatiyo Sangshad Bhaban, Dhaka

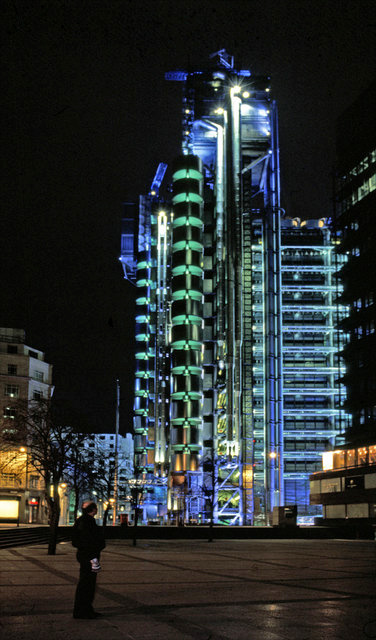
Exterior lighting of the Lloyd's building in London

Architectural lighting design is a field of work or study concerned with the design of lighting systems within the built environment, both interior and exterior. It can include the manipulation and design of daylight, electric light, or both, to serve human needs. Lighting design is grounded in both science and the visual arts. The basic aim of lighting within the built environment is to enable occupants to see clearly and comfortably. The objective of architectural lighting design is to balance the art and science of lighting to create mood and visual interest, and to enhance the experience of a space or place while still meeting technical and safety requirements.

== Overview ==
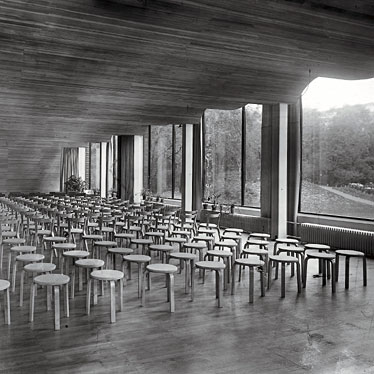
The predominantly daylit auditorium of the Viipuri Municipal Library in the 1930s

The purpose of architectural lighting design is to balance the characteristics of light within a space to optimize the technical, visual, and, most recently, the non-visual components of ergonomics with respect to the illumination of buildings and spaces.

The technical requirements include the amount of light needed to perform a task, the energy consumed by the lighting within a space and the relative distribution and direction of light so as not to cause unnecessary glare or discomfort. The visual aspects of light are those concerned with the aesthetics and narrative of the space (e.g. the mood of a restaurant, the experience of an exhibition in a museum, the promotion of goods within a retail space, the reinforcement of a corporate brand) while the non-visual aspects are concerned with human health and well-being.

As part of the lighting design process, both cultural and contextual factors also need to be considered. For example, bright lighting was a mark of wealth through much of Chinese history, but uncontrolled bright light is known to be detrimental to insects, birds, and the visibility of stars.

== History ==
The history of electric light is well documented, and with the developments in lighting technology the profession of lighting developed alongside it. The development of high-efficiency, low-cost fluorescent lamps led to a reliance on electric light and a uniform blanket approach to lighting, but the energy crisis of the 1970s required more design consideration and reinvigorated the use of daylight.

The New York-based Illuminating Engineering Society (IES) was formed in 1906. A London-based organization established in 1909 with the same name is now known as the Society of Light and Lighting (SLL), a part of CIBSE. The International Commission on Illumination (CIE) was established in 1913. The Institution of Lighting Professionals was established as the Association of Public Lighting Engineers in 1924. Around the world similar professional organizations evolved.

Initially, these industry organizations were primarily focused on the science and engineering of lighting rather than the aesthetic design, but in 1969 a group of designers established the International Association of Lighting Designers (IALD). Other associations purely for lighting design have included the Professional Lighting Designers' Association (PLDA) established in 1994, the Association de Concepteurs Eclairage (ACE) in France established 1995, the Associazione Professionisti dell'Illuminazione (APIL) in Italy established in 1998, the Associação Brasileira de Arquitetos de Iluminação in Brazil in 1999 and the Professional Association of Lighting Designers in Spain (APDI) established in 2008.

== As a profession ==
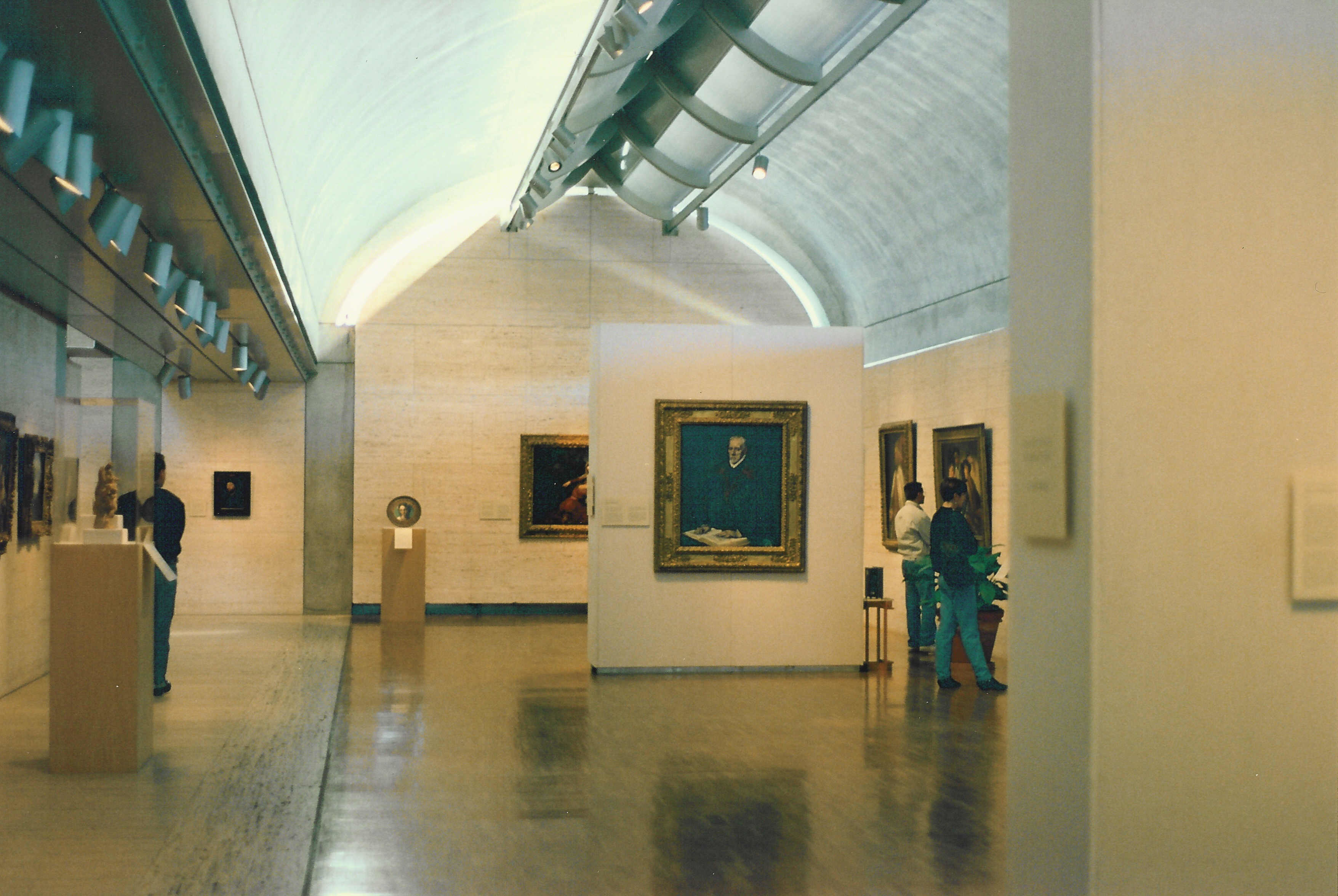
Kimbell Art Museum interior with daylight control and electric lighting design by Richard Kelly (1969)

Architectural lighting designer is a stand-alone profession that sits alongside the professions of architecture, interior design, landscape architecture and electrical engineering.

One of the earliest proponents of architectural lighting design was Richard Kelly who established his practice in 1935. Kelly developed an approach to architectural lighting that is still used today, based on the perception of three visual elements as presented in a 1952 joint meeting of The American Institute of Architects, the American Society of Industrial Designers (now the Industrial Designers Society of America), and the Illuminating Engineering Society of North America, in Cleveland.

=== Education ===
While many architectural lighting designers have a background in electrical engineering, architectural engineering, architecture, or luminaire manufacturing, several universities and technical schools now offer degree programs specifically in architectural lighting design.

=== Process ===
The process of architectural lighting design generally follows the architect's plan of works in terms of key project stages: feasibility, concept, detail, construction documentation, site supervision and commissioning.

After the feasibility stage, where the parameters for the project are set, the concept stage is when the lighting design is developed in terms of lit effect, technical lighting targets and overall visual strategy usually using concept sketches, renderings, or mood boards.

== Day lighting ==
The source for daylight or natural lighting is the sun. Sunlight provides the greatest quality of light, rated 100 CRI, on the electromagnetic spectrum. There are psychological and physical health benefits that come from using daylight in a space. For example, it can help to ease seasonal affective disorder (SAD), it can provide people with the necessary vitamin D, and can assist in regulating circadian rhythms, or daily light and dark cycles. Using daylight as a light source can eliminate the use of energy. Daylighting can also cause deterioration of materials and finishes and an increased use of energy for cooling a space. The architectural makeup of a space impacts the day lighting. It can be used in a space through windows, openings of the interior, skylights, and reflective surfaces.

== Electric lighting ==
Electric lighting or artificial lighting is a type of architectural lighting that includes electric light sources. The overall purpose of electric lighting is to allow the user of the space to see at various times in the day, but especially at night or in winter season, when daylight is no longer a possible or sufficient source of light. Artificial lighting helps to create or enhance the aesthetic of a space. Various techniques can be implemented when it comes to electric lighting, since users have more control over the light. This can include dimming or increasing the brightness of a lamp, diffusion of the light source, and the use of different lamp hues. The main sources used for electric lighting include incandescent lamps, solid state lamps (LED, etc.), and gas discharge lamps.

== Fixtures ==
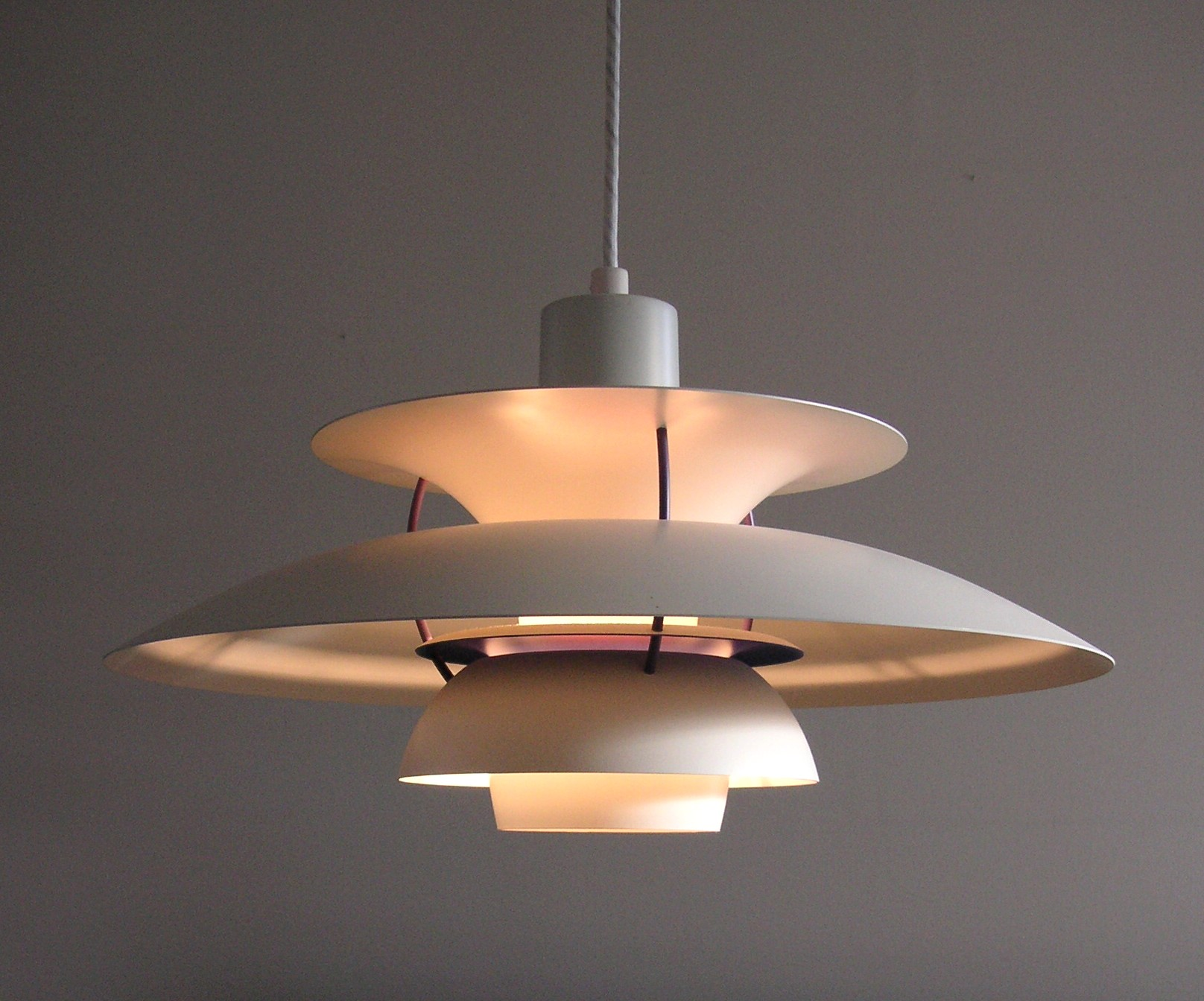
The PH5 lamp, designed in 1958

Lighting fixtures come in a wide variety of styles for various functions. The most important functions are as a holder for the light source, to provide directed light and to avoid visual glare. Some are very plain and functional, while some are pieces of art in themselves. Nearly any material can be used, so long as it can tolerate the excess heat and is in keeping with safety codes.

An important property of light fixtures is the luminous efficacy or wall-plug efficiency, meaning the amount of usable light emanating from the fixture per used energy, usually measured in lumen per watt. A fixture using replaceable light sources can also have its efficiency quoted as the percentage of light passed from the "bulb" to the surroundings. The more transparent the lighting fixture is, the higher efficacy. Shading the light will normally decrease efficiency but increase the directionality and the visual comfort probability.

The PH-lamps are a series of light fixtures designed by Danish designer and writer Poul Henningsen from 1926 onwards. The lamp is designed with multiple concentric shades to eliminate visual glare, only emitting reflected light, obscuring the light source.

== Lighting design layers ==
Designers utilize the idea of lighting layers when creating a lighting plan for a space. Lighting layers include: task layer, focal layer, ambient layer, decorative layer, and daylight layer. Each layer contributes a function to the space and often they work together to create a well composed lighting design. The task layer is lighting that serves a purpose to perform a certain job or task. Typically, in this layer, there tends to be a need for more light. An example of this would be the use of under cabinet lighting in a kitchen. The focal layer is when lighting is used to highlight a certain feature in a room, such as a fireplace. This type of lighting draws the eye to that certain area. The ambient layer provides for background or general lighting. This layer has a strong influence on the brightness of a space. In the decorative layer, lighting is used as an ornament to the space and can help develop the style. The daylight layer uses natural light or the sun to light a space. Using the layering technique helps to develop the aesthetic and functionality of lighting.

== Photometric studies ==
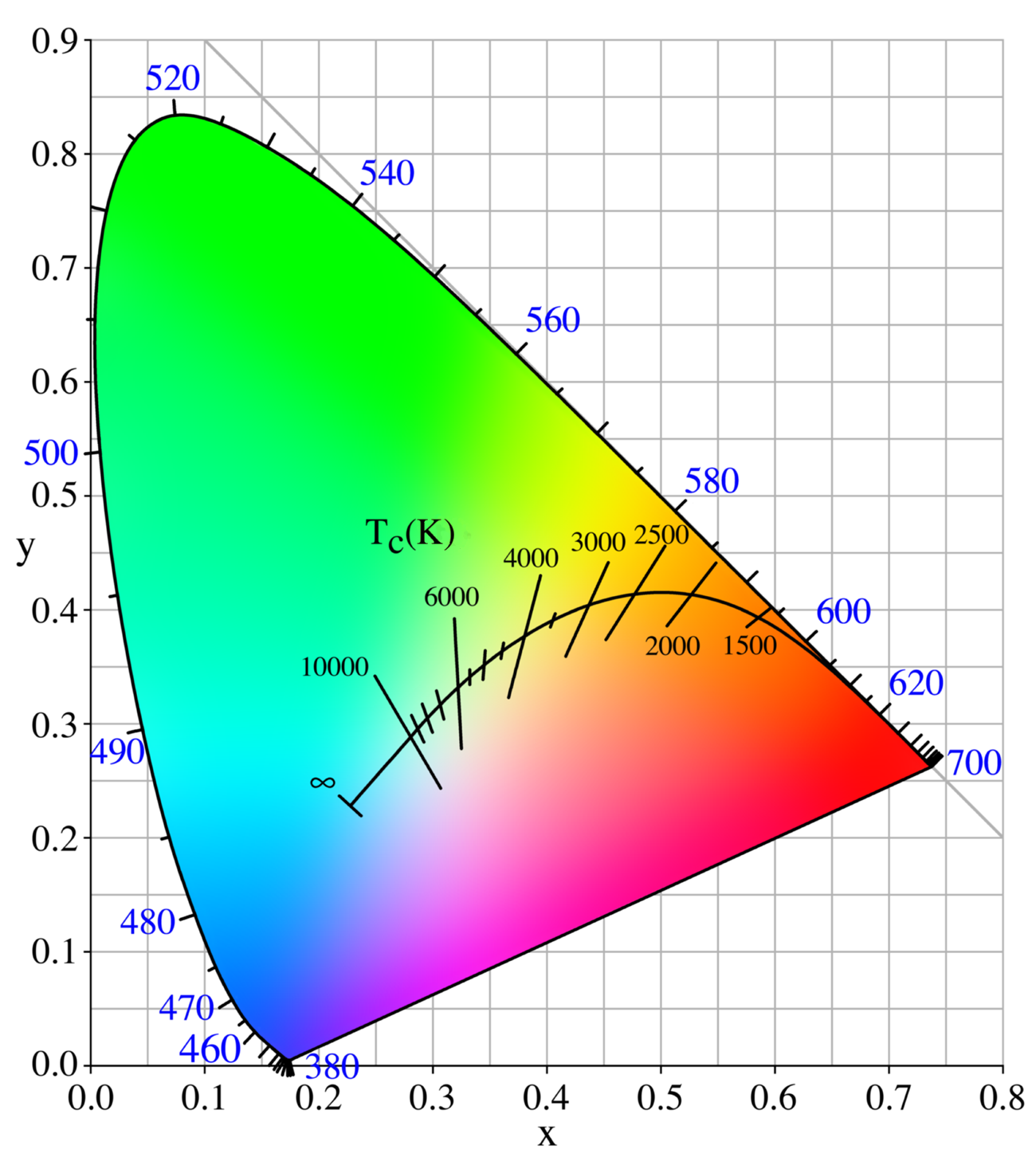
The CIE 1931 xy chromaticity diagram, also showing the chromaticities of black-body light sources of various temperatures (Planckian locus), and lines of constant correlated color temperature

Photometric studies are performed to simulate lighting designs for projects before they are built or renovated. This enables architects, lighting designers, and engineers to determine whether a proposed lighting layout will deliver the amount of light intended. They will also be able to determine the contrast ratio between light and dark areas. In many cases these studies are referenced against IESNA or CIBSE recommended lighting practices for the type of application. Depending on the type of area, different design aspects may be emphasized for safety or practicality (i.e. such as maintaining uniform light levels, avoiding glare or highlighting certain areas). A specialized lighting design application is often used to create these, which typically combine the use of two-dimensional digital CAD drawings and lighting simulation software.

Color temperature for white light sources also affects their use for certain applications. The color temperature of a white light source is the temperature in kelvin of a theoretical black body emitter that most closely matches the spectral characteristics of the lamp. Incandescent light bulbs have a color temperature around 2700 to 3000 kelvin; daylight is around 6500 kelvin. Lower color temperature lamps have relatively more energy in the yellow and red part of the visible spectrum, while high color temperatures correspond to lamps with more of a blue-white appearance. For critical inspection or color matching tasks, or for retail displays of food and clothing, the color temperature of the lamps will be selected for the best overall lighting effect. Color may also be used for functional reasons. For example, blue light makes it difficult to see veins and thus may be used to discourage drug use.

== Correlated color temperature ==
Temperature	Source
1,700 K	Match flame, low-pressure sodium lamps (LPS/SOX)
1,850 K	Candle flame, sunrise, sunset
2,700–3,300 K	Incandescent lamps, soft-white fluorescent lamps
3,000 K	Warm-white fluorescent lamps
4,100–4,150 K	Moonlight, cool-white fluorescent lamps
5,000 K	Horizon daylight
5,500–6,000 K	Vertical daylight, electronic flash
6,200 K	Xenon short-arc lamp
6,500 K	Daylight, overcast, daylight fluorescent lamps
6,500–10,500 K	LCD or CRT screen
15,000–27,000 K	Clear blue poleward sky
These temperatures are merely characteristic; considerable variation may be present.

The correlated color temperature (CCT) of a light source is the temperature of an ideal black-body radiator that radiates light of comparable chromaticity to that of the light source. Color temperature is a characteristic of visible light that has important applications in lighting, photography, videography, publishing, manufacturing, astrophysics, horticulture, and other fields. In practice, color temperature is only meaningful for light sources that do in fact correspond somewhat closely to the radiation of some black body (i.e. those on a line from red-orange via yellow and more or less white to blueish white); it does not make sense to speak of the color temperature of (e.g. a green or a purple light). Color temperature is conventionally stated in the SI unit of absolute temperature, the kelvin, having the unit symbol K.

For lighting building interiors, it is often important to take into account the color temperature of illumination. For example, a warmer (i.e. lower color temperature) light is often used in public areas to promote relaxation, while a cooler (higher color temperature) light is used to enhance concentration in offices.

CCT dimming for LED technology is regarded as a difficult task, since binning, age and temperature drift effects of LEDs change the actual color value output. Here feedback loop systems can be used for example with color sensors, to actively monitor and control the color output of multiple color mixing LEDs.

The color temperature of the electromagnetic radiation emitted from an ideal black body is defined as its surface temperature in Kelvin, or alternatively in mireds (micro-reciprocal kelvin). This permits the definition of a standard by which light sources are compared.

== Methods ==
For simple installations, hand-calculations based on tabular data can be used to provide an acceptable lighting design. More critical or optimized designs now routinely use mathematical modeling on a computer.

Based on the positions and mounting heights of the fixtures, and their photometric characteristics, the proposed lighting layout can be checked for uniformity and quantity of illumination. For larger projects or those with irregular floor plans, lighting design software can be used. Each fixture has its location entered, and the reflectance of walls, ceiling, and floors can be entered. The computer program will then produce a set of contour charts overlaid on the project floor plan, showing the light level to be expected at the working height. More advanced programs can include the effect of light from windows or skylights, allowing further optimization of the operating cost of the lighting installation. The amount of daylight received in an internal space can typically be analyzed by undertaking a daylight factor calculation.

The IES zonal cavity method (also known as the lumen method) is used as a basis for both hand, tabulated, and computer calculations. This method uses the reflectance coefficients of room surfaces to model the contribution to useful illumination at the working level of the room due to light reflected from the walls and the ceiling. Simplified photometric values are usually given by fixture manufacturers for use in this method.

Computer modeling of outdoor flood lighting usually proceeds directly from photometric data. The total lighting power of a lamp is divided into small solid angular regions. Each region is extended to the surface which is to be lit and the area calculated, giving the light power per unit of area. Where multiple lamps are used to illuminate the same area, each one's contribution is summed. Again the tabulated light levels (in lux or foot-candles) can be presented as contour lines of constant lighting value, overlaid on the project plan drawing. Hand calculations might only be required at a few points, but computer calculations allow a better estimate of the uniformity and lighting level.

== Design-media terminology ==
Adjustable accent fixture
Used to point at certain design elements
Bollard
A type of architectural outdoor lighting that is a short, upright ground-mounted unit typically used to provide cutoff type illumination for egress lighting, to light walkways, steps, or other pathways
"Cans" with a variety of lamps
Jargon for inexpensive downlighting products that are recessed into the ceiling, or sometimes for uplights placed on the floor. The name comes from the shape of the housing. The term "pot lights" is often used in Canada and parts of the US.
Chandelier
A branched ornamental light fixture designed to be mounted on ceilings or walls
Cove light
Recessed into the ceiling in a long box against a wall
Emergency lighting or exit sign
Connected to a battery backup or to an electric circuit that has emergency power if the mains power fails
Flood lighting
Usually pole- or stanchion-mounted; for landscape, roadways, and parking lots
High- and low-bay lighting
Typically used for general lighting for industrial buildings and often big-box stores
Lamp
Lightbulb, comes in various shapes and sizes
Luminaire
Holds and supports lamp, provides electrification
Outdoor lighting and landscape lighting
Used to illuminate walkways, parking lots, roadways, building exteriors and architectural details, gardens, and parks
Pendant light
Suspended from the ceiling with a chain or pipe
Recessed light
The protective housing is concealed behind a ceiling or wall, leaving only the fixture itself exposed. The ceiling-mounted version is often called a downlight
Sconce
A decorative light fixture that is mounted to a wall
Street light
A type of outdoor pole-mounted light used to light streets and roadways; similar to pole-mounted flood lights but with a type II lens (side to side light distribution pattern) instead of type III
Strip lights or industrial lighting
Often long lines of fluorescent lamps used in a warehouse or factory
Surface-mounted light
The finished housing is exposed, not flush mount with surface.
Track lighting fixture
Individual fixtures (called track heads) can be positioned anywhere along the track, which provides electric power
Under-cabinet light
Mounted below kitchen wall cabinets
Troffer
Recessed fluorescent light fixtures, usually rectangular in shape to fit into a drop ceiling grid
Wall grazing fixture
Light is closely placed to wall, typically to enhance a textured surface.
Wallwasher
An asymmetric light fixture that lights from ceiling to floor and flatly illuminates the wall

== Lamp types ==
Different types of electric lighting have vastly differing efficacy and color temperature:

Name	Optical spectrum	Luminous efficacy (lm/W)	Lifetime (MTTF) (hours)	Color temperature (kelvin)	Color appearance	Color rendering index
Incandescent light bulb	Continuous	4–17	2–20000	2400–3400	Warm white (yellowish)	100
Halogen lamp	Continuous	16–23	3000–6000	3200	Warm white (yellowish)	100
Fluorescent lamp	Mercury line + Phosphor	52–100 (white)	8000–20000	2700–5000^{*}	White (various color temperatures), as well as saturated colors available	15-85
Metal halide lamp	Quasi-continuous	50–115	6000–20000	3000–4500	Cold white	65–93
Sulfur lamp	Continuous	80–110	15000–20000	6000	Pale green	79
High-pressure sodium	Broadband	55–140	10000–40000	1800–2200^{*}	Pinkish orange	0–70
Low-pressure sodium	Narrow line	100–200	18000–20000	1800^{*}	Yellow, no color rendering	0
Light-emitting diode (white)	Line plus phosphor	10–200	50,000–100,000	Various white from 2700 to 6000^{*}	Various color temperatures, as well as saturated colors	70–85 (white)
Induction lamp	Mercury line + Phosphor	70–90	80,000–100,000	Various white from 2700 to 6000^{*}	Various color temperatures, as well as saturated colors	70–85 (white)

^{*}Color temperature is defined as the temperature of a black body emitting a similar spectrum; these spectra are quite different from those of black bodies.

The most efficient source of electric light is the low-pressure sodium lamp. It produces, for all practical purposes, a monochromatic yellow light, which gives a similarly monochromatic perception of any illuminated scene. For this reason, it is generally reserved for outdoor public lighting usages. Low-pressure sodium lights are favored for public lighting by astronomers, since the light pollution that they generate can be easily filtered, contrary to broadband or continuous spectra.

=== Incandescent light bulb ===
The modern incandescent light bulb, with a coiled filament of tungsten, was commercialized in the 1920s developed from the carbon filament lamp introduced in about 1880. As well as bulbs for normal illumination, there is a very wide range, including low voltage, low-power types often used as components in equipment, but now largely displaced by LEDs.

=== Fluorescent lamp ===
Fluorescent lamps consist of a glass tube that contains mercury vapor or argon under low pressure. Electricity flowing through the tube causes the gases to give off ultraviolet energy. The inside of the tubes are coated with phosphors that give off visible light when struck by ultraviolet energy.

=== LED lamp ===
Light-emitting diodes (LEDs) became widespread as indicator lights in the 1970s. With the invention of high-output LEDs by Shuji Nakamura, LEDs are now in use as solid-state lighting for general lighting applications.

Initially, due to relatively high cost per lumen, LED lighting was most used for lamp assemblies of under 10 W such as flashlights. Development of higher-output lamps was motivated by programs such as the U.S. L Prize.

== See also ==
- Architectural glass – Building material
- Architectural light shelf – Horizontal surface that reflects daylight deep into a building
- Architecture of the night – Architecture integrating and emphasizing electric light effects at the design stage
- Beam angle – Width of the beam of light emitted by a light
- Daylight harvesting – Automatically variable electric lighting
- Deck prism – Means of transmitting light from the sun to the inside of a boat
- Light art – Visual art using light as a medium
- Light + Building – Biennial architecture and technology trade fair
- Light tube – Architectural structures that transmit or distribute light
- Lighting control system – Intelligent network based lighting control
- Lighting for the elderly – Age-appropriate lighting
- List of lighting design software
- Lumen method – Simplified light level calculation
- Over illumination – Excess artificial light in an environment
- Passive solar building design – Architectural engineering that uses the Sun's heat without electric or mechanical systems
- Professional Lighting and Sound Association – Trade organization
- Smart glass – Glass with electrically switchable opacity
- Stage lighting – Craft of lighting at performances
- Sun path – Arc-like path that the Sun appears to follow across the sky
- Sustainable lighting – Lighting designed with energy efficient light source
- Transom (architectural) – Horizontal structural piece separating a door from a window above it
- Vivid Sydney – Recurring festival in Sydney, New South Wales, Australia
