= John Ott =

American photographer (1909–2000)

Dr. John Nash Ott
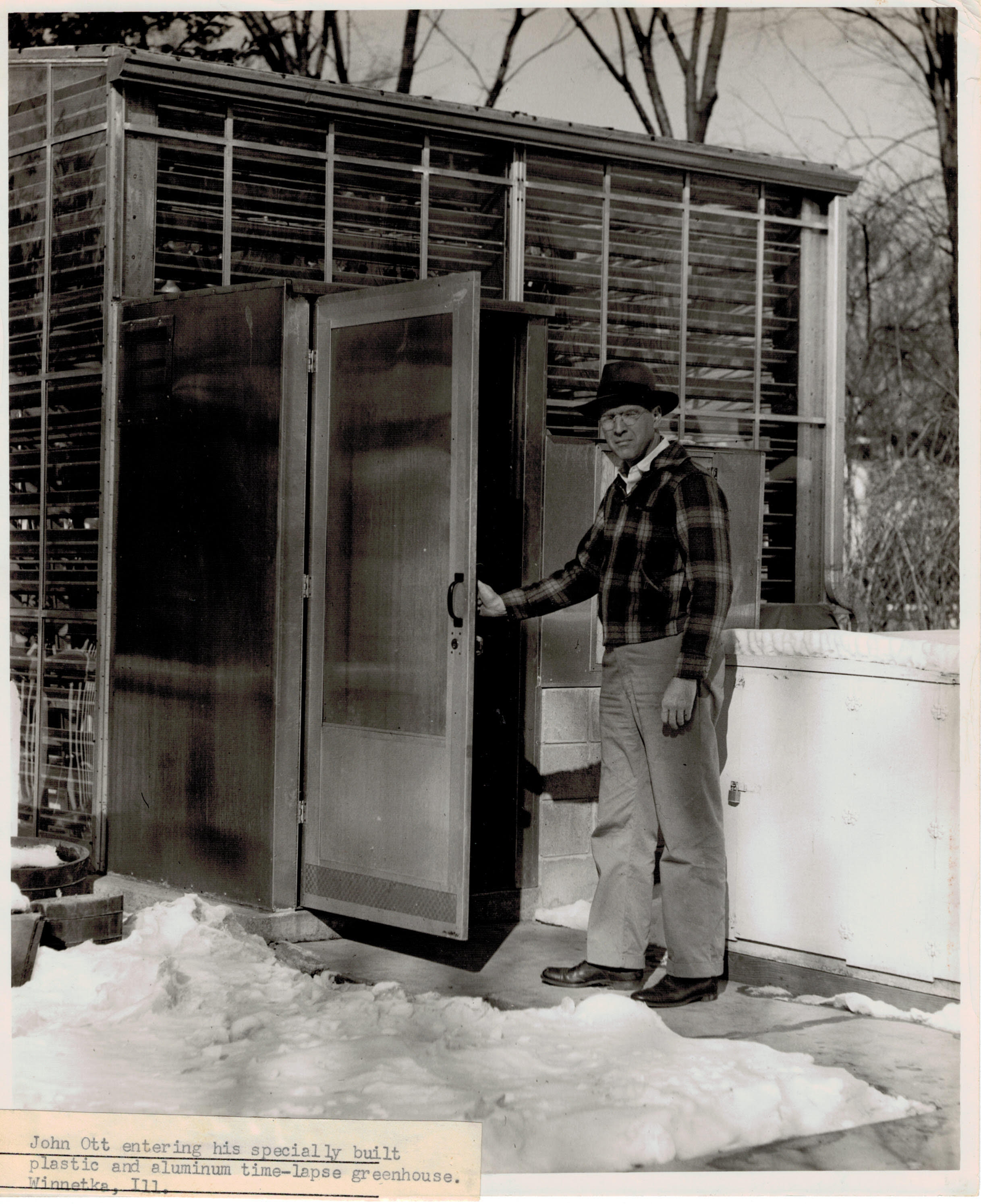
- Ott in front of his greenhouse in Winnetka, Illinois, date unknown
- Born: October 23, 1909
- Died: 6 April 2000 (aged 90)
- Occupations: Photographer; cinematographer; medical research; inventor; optics
- Known for: Time-lapse photography; light therapy; full-spectrum light; founder of OttLite
- Website: OttLite Technology

John Nash Ott (23 October 1909 – 6 April 2000) was a photo-researcher, writer, photographer, and cinematographer who was an early adopter of many modern photographic practices, including time-lapse photography and full-spectrum lighting.

== Photography ==
Ott's early career was in finance. He never went to college, although he enrolled in finance courses at Harvard Business School while working for several Chicago area banks. During this period, he developed an interest in time-lapse photography. He made his first time-lapse film in 1927, while he was still in high school, but did not develop the automated mechanical camera rig he used in his later films until 1937. His early amateur films led him to a career in cinematography. In addition to making films, he performed research about the effects of natural lighting on plants, animals, and humans.

Initially, Ott's interest in time-lapse movie photography, mostly of plants, was just a hobby. Starting in the 1930s, Ott bought and built more and more time-lapse equipment, eventually building a large greenhouse full of plants, cameras, and self-built automated electric moving camera systems (the first movie camera motion control systems ever built) for moving the cameras to follow the growth of plants as they developed. He time-lapsed his entire greenhouse of plants and cameras as they all worked and grew.

His work caught the attention of organizations who employed him to make time-lapse segments for films they were producing, including the educational film Secrets of Life, for the Walt Disney Company in 1956, and The Story of Wheat, for the Santa Fe Railroad. From the late 1940s to the early 1950s he hosted a Chicago-area television program called How Does Your Garden Grow, which featured gardening tips, botanical information, and short time-lapse films. Episodes of this program can be viewed on the YouTube page of the Winnetka Historical Society. More episodes of How Does Your Garden Grow, Ott's educational films, and raw time-lapse footage can be viewed from the Chicago Film Archives' John Nash Ott Collection.

In the later years of his life, Ott developed a theory that movement of plants could be manipulated by varying the amount of water that plants were given, and varying the color temperature of the lights in the studio, with some colors causing the plants to flower and other colors causing the plants to bear fruit. His 1958 memoir My Ivory Cellar details not only his personal history as a filmmaker, but also outlines these ideas.

Ott's experiments with different colored lighting systems and their effects on the health of plants led to experiments with colored lights on the health of animals, humans, and individual cells, using time-lapse micro-photography. Ott's experiments led him to believe that only a full spectrum of natural light (including natural amounts of infrared and ultraviolet) could promote full health in plants, animals, and humans. He wrote the 1973 book Health and Light advancing his theories. Such topics were also addressed in his 1974 film Exploring the Spectrum.

Ott received an honorary doctorate in science from Loyola University of Chicago in 1958. Although it is not customary for recipients of such an honorary doctorate to adopt the prefix "Dr.", he was widely referred to as "Dr. Ott" thereafter.

== Natural lighting products ==
Ott believed that the proprietary lighting technology he developed was the closest replication of the Sun's natural wavelengths. He developed several consumer products based on this technology, including altered lightbulbs and a special pair of polarized sunglasses which he believed would enhance the physical and mental fortitude of anyone wearing them.

== Bibliography ==
- Ott, John (1958). My Ivory Cellar. Chicago, IL: Twentieth Century Press. LCCN 58-59587.
- Ott, John N. (1973). Health and Light: The Effects of Natural and Artificial Light on Man and Other Living Things. The Devin-Adair Company, Inc. ISBN 0-671-47433-2. *Film: Dancing Flowers, John Ott, 1950s;
- Film: Exploring the Spectrum, John Ott, 1974; Released as DVD in 2008 – http://www.orgonelab.org/cart/xspectrum.htm
- Series of seven articles in seven issues of the International Journal for Biosocial Research, 1985–1991
