= Light ergonomics =

Light ergonomics is the relationship between the light source and the individual. Poor light can be divided into the following:

- Individual or socio-cultural expectations
- Insufficient light
- Poor distribution of light
- Improper contrast
- Glare
- Flicker
- Thermal heating (over or under)
- Acoustic noise (especially fluorescents)
- Color spectrum (full-spectrum light, color temperature, etc.)

== Effects of poor light ==
The effects of poor light can include the following:

- low productivity
- high human error rates
- inability to match or select correct colors
- eyestrain
- headache
- a reduction in mental alertness
- general malaise
- low employee morale

Recommended Illumination Levels
Type of Activity	Ranges of Illuminations (Lux)
Public spaces with dark surroundings	30
Simple orientation for short temporary visits	50
Working spaces where visual tasks are only occasionally performed	100
Performance of visual tasks of high contrast or large scale	300
Performance of visual tasks of medium contrast or small size	500
Performance of visual tasks of low contrast or very small size	1000
Performance of visual tasks near threshold of person's ability to recognize an image	3000-10000

== Types of light sources ==
Light Bulbs
Type	Common Application	Efficiency	Colour Rendering	Fog-Smog Penetration
Incandescent	Homes	Poor	Good	
Fluorescent	Home&Office	Good	Fair to good	
Mercury	Factories, offices	Fair	Fair to moderate	
Low pressure sodium	Roadway	Good	Poor	Good
High pressure sodium	Factories, commercial	Good	Fair to good	Good
Metal Halide	Factories, commercial	Good	Good	
Light-emitting diode (LED)	Home & office, commercial, industrial	Excellent	Good	

== See also ==
- Ergonomics
- Full-spectrum light
- Artificial sunlight
