= Light in school buildings =

Light in school buildings traditionally is from a combination of daylight and electric light to illuminate learning spaces (e.g. classrooms, labs, studios, etc.), hallways, cafeterias, offices and other interior areas. Light fixtures currently in use usually provide students and teachers with satisfactory visual performance, i.e., the ability to read a book, have lunch, or play basketball in a gymnasium. However, classroom lighting may also affect students' circadian systems, which may in turn affect test scores, attendance and behavior.

Exposure to light, or lack thereof, plays a significant role in sleep cycles. All animals, including humans, have evolved circadian rhythms, which respond to the earth's 24-hour cycle. These rhythms include the sleep–wake cycle, hormone production, and core body temperature cycles. The timing of these patterns is set by the 24-hour light–dark cycle. In particular, short-wavelength "blue" light in the daylight spectrum has maximal effect on human circadian rhythms. Research has shown that when these patterns are disrupted, individuals are more susceptible to ailments such as breast cancer, obesity, sleep deprivation, mood disorders, and other health problems.

According to Energy Star, after salaries and benefits, energy costs are the largest operating expense for school districts. Fluorescent lighting systems are the most prevalent sources of illumination in schools. These systems provide low cost, long life, high efficacy, good color, and low levels of noise and flicker. Lighting systems should be designed with respect to the requirements of the activity to be performed. For instance, lighting over a desk should be different than light required in cafeterias or hallways. Current sustainable design guidelines for schools usually focus only on energy-conserving luminaires with consideration only for visual needs. Several aspects of building performance, including lighting, are fundamental in providing an environment that is conducive to learning. Facility aspects such as security and safety, indoor air quality, thermal comfort, visual comfort, and acoustic comfort conditions can affect attendance, teacher turnover rates, and occupant health.

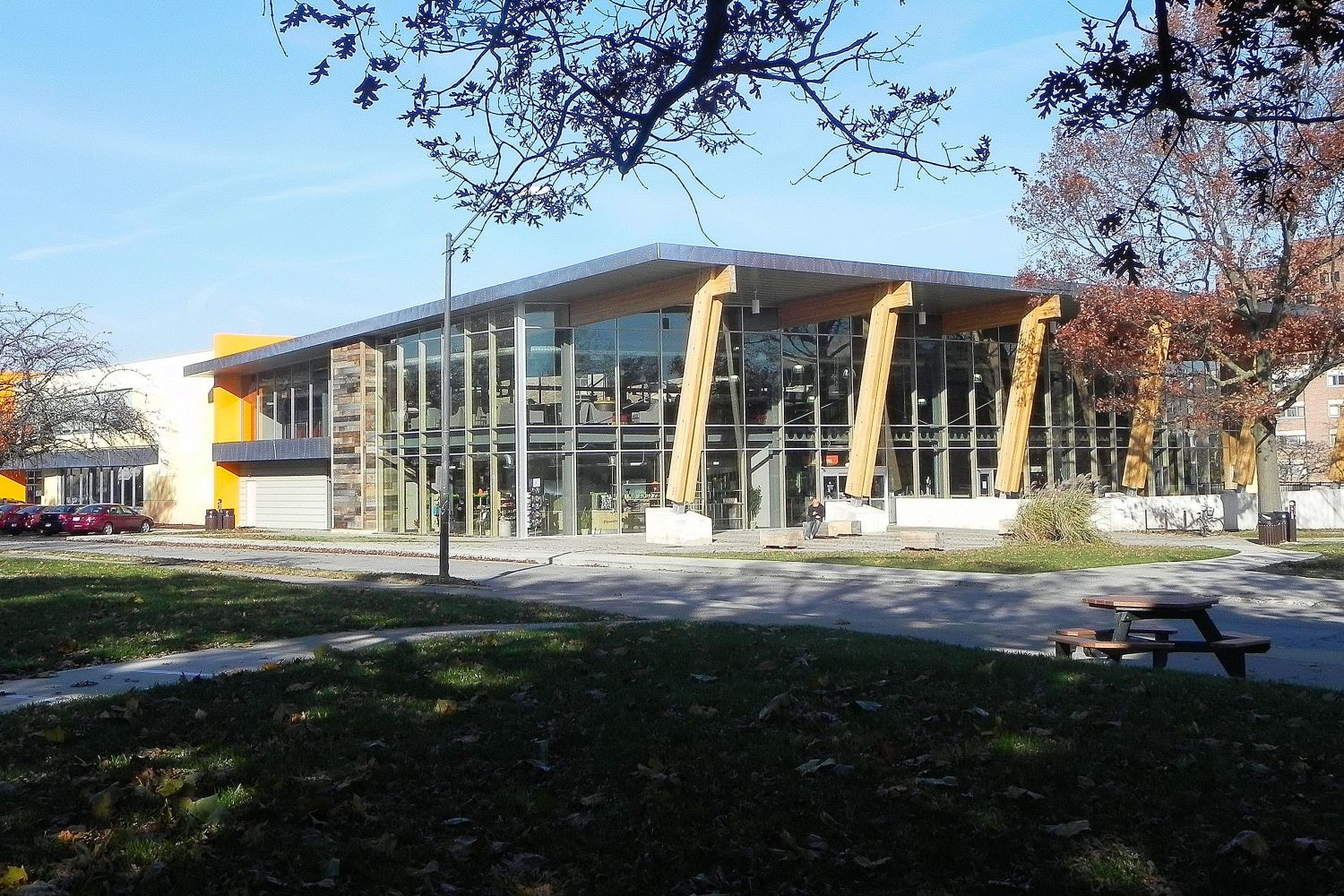
A university building designed to be primarily lit by daylight during operating hours.

Studies regarding whether daylight improves student performance (e.g., higher test scores) are inconclusive. The Heschong-Mahone Group's studies between 1999 and 2003 reported early on that daylight increased academic results by 20%, but because their model was used incorrectly, it was later demonstrated that there was no significant variance due to sunlight.

A 2009 study showed that when students were not exposed to daylight in the early part of the day, sleep times were pushed later into the evening/night.

== Measuring light ==
Typical measurements of light have used a dosimeter. Dosimeters measure an individual's or an object's exposure to something in the environment, such as light dosimeters and ultraviolet dosimeters.

== Application and effect ==
Ongoing research in the light and health field will have implications on school architecture and design because studies show that it is necessary to expose students to short-wavelength light during the early part of the day to maintain circadian entrainment. Implementing "circadian light" treatment could be in the form of windows, skylights, or blue indoor lighting fixtures or blue light therapy devices. There is also evidence that exposing rooms to natural daylight will make a room feel larger and more comfortable. However there are tradeoffs, as direct penetrating sunlight can have negative effects on productivity and comfort.

== See also ==
- American Institute of Architects
- Circadian rhythm
- Daylight
- Lighting
- Full-spectrum light
- Melatonin
- Sleep
- United States Green Building Council (USGBC)
