= Lighting for the elderly =

Age-appropriate lighting

Designing lighting for the elderly requires special consideration and care from architects and lighting designers. As people age, they experience neurodegeneration in the retina and in the suprachiasmatic nucleus (SCN). Less light reaches the back of the eyes because the pupils decrease in size as one ages, the lens inside one's eye becomes thicker, and the lens scatters more light, causing objects and colors to appear less vivid. These symptoms are particularly common with persons having alzheimer's disease. Older people also have reduced levels of retinal illuminance, such as having smaller pupils and less transparent crystalline lenses. Furthermore, as an individual ages, they begin to lose retinal neurons, which not only compromises the ability to see but also to register a robust daily pattern of light-dark that is needed to maintain biological rhythms. The 24-hour light-dark cycle is the most important external stimulus for regulating the timing of the circadian cycle.

In addition to the aging eye, lighting designers need to consider the unique lifestyle needs of the elderly. It is especially important to provide strong illumination in stairwells to prevent slip and trips, for example. Due to physical limitations, they may be deprived of natural sunlight. Many nursing homes and assisted living facilities have dim, constant light levels and poor light spectra, often caused by extensive use of fluorescent lighting. Although widely used in offices and factories, it is unsuitable for clinics and homes. This can cause disruption of the body’s circadian rhythms, which can potentially lead to negative health effects. Flicker from the bulbs can be disturbing, especially for epilepsy patients, and the colour rendition is poor when compared with incandescent bulbs.

== Health concerns ==
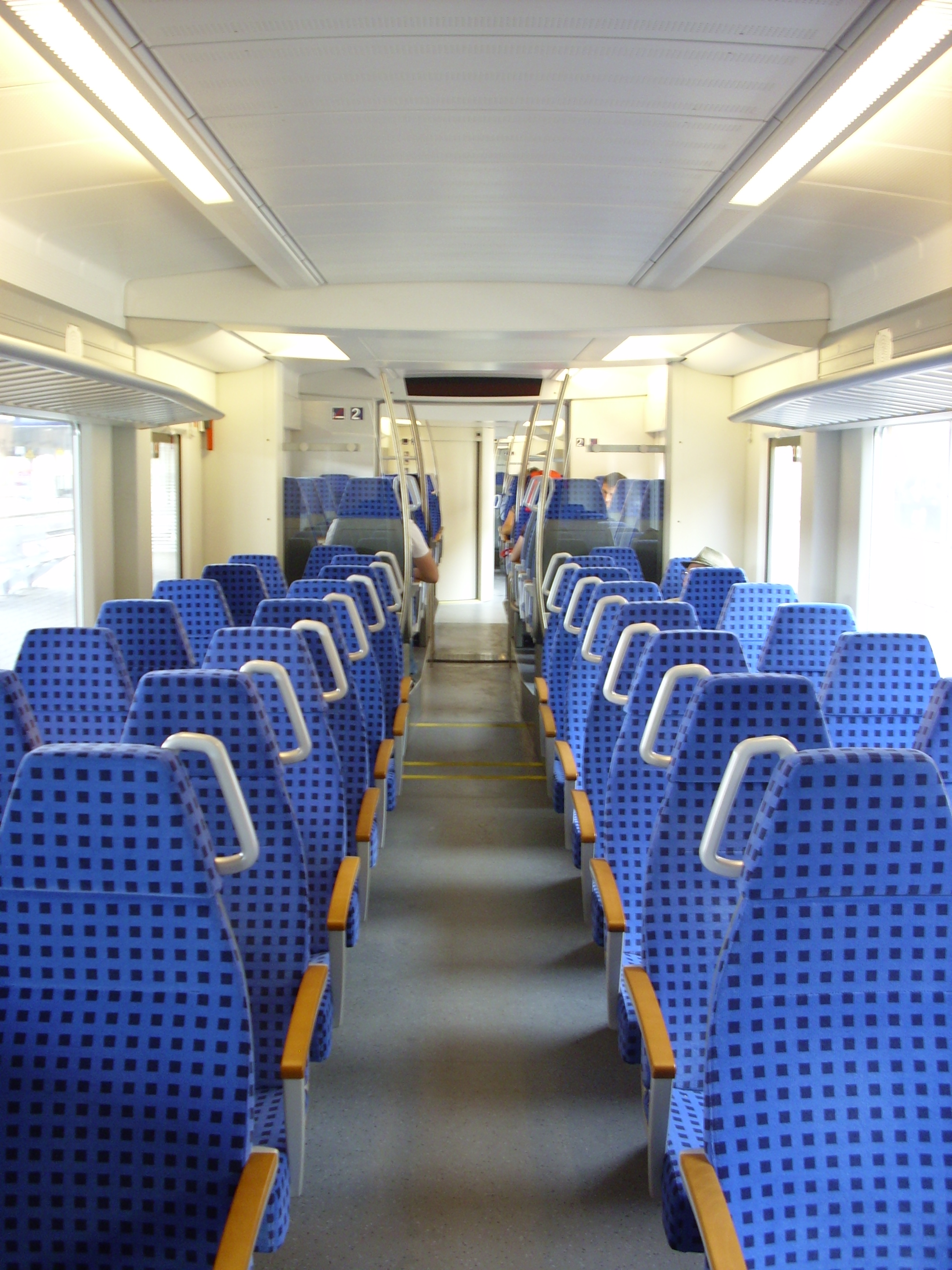
Grab rails on a longer-distance commuter train catering for mainly seated passengers

=== Accident sensitivity ===
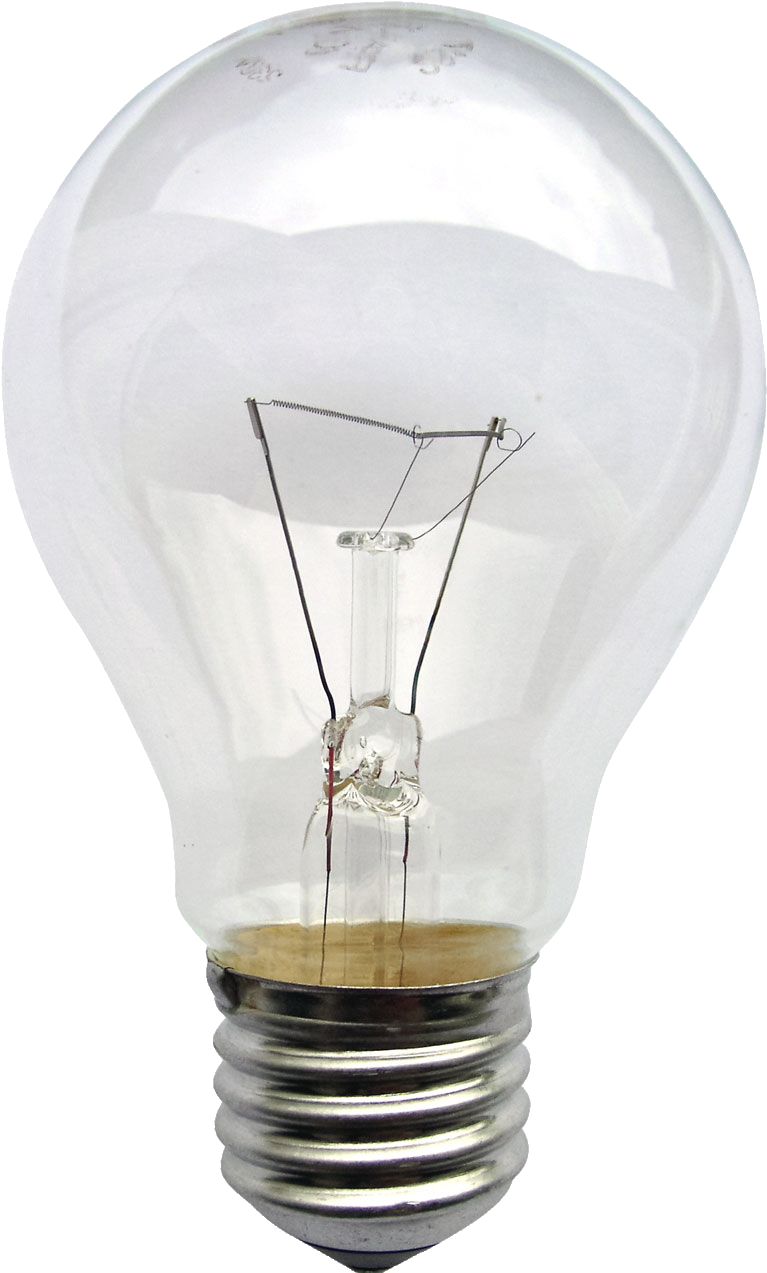
A 230-volt incandescent light bulb, which gives strong, steady light ideal for illumination.

Low lighting levels may contribute to slips, trips and falls in the elderly by lowering visibility of hazards such as unexpected steps, or sudden changes in floor surfaces. Obstacles to a safe passage may include clutter or ill-placed furniture, which can cause a slip or a trip. Grab bars and stair rails are obvious aids but must be visible to the user, and so such environments demand strong lighting. Falls of elderly people causes a significant number of hip joint fractures, replacement of which is a serious medical event. Depending on fall configuration, other bones may be fractured. Head injury is also possible. Falls from ladders are very common among the elderly, especially men, with potentially worse injuries owing to the greater heights involved.

Fall prevention is thus an important consideration in designing homes for the elderly, and one of the most critical parts of that design process is supplying strong and effective lighting. Thus, when switched on, lights should react instantaneously, so the user is not surprised by a hidden obstacle as they moves into a kitchen or bathroom, for example. In such a case, incandescent light bulbs are preferred over fluorescent lighting, because they react instantaneously while a CFL takes time to warm up and become bright. Incandescent light bulbs also offer much greater illuminance than many other light sources, are relatively low cost and easy to install. Higher lighting levels enable users to see potential hazards before they need to take avoiding action, and so negotiate them safely and easily. Excellent colour rendering (as measured by the Colour rendering index) by such incandescent light also helps users identify colours correctly. Halogen bulbs are also available for greater efficiency, as are rough service bulbs to avoid discriminatory regulations, especially in the EU. No doubt LED lights will become an alternative source of high quality lighting in the future, but in 2013 they remain expensive for domestic use. Rough service bulbs are available in sizes up to 200 watt in all varieties of fittings. Although lifetime is generally lower than for CFLs, they are replaced easily.

But lighting should also be free from glare and highlights so as not to distract or even temporarily blind the user. Some skill is needed to meet the several criteria governing good lighting systems, especially for senior citizens and patients. Lighting ergonomics attempts to address the problem of designing safe light environments as well as specific lighting products.

=== Circadian entrainment ===
Underlying the foundation of light as therapy is the understanding that all living organisms have biological rhythms that repeat approximately in 24-hour cycles, in accordance with the cycle of sunlight. The most prominent way to measure whether a body is entrained in this circadian cycle is by measuring melatonin secretion, cortisol, and core body temperature. The suprachiasmatic nucleus (SCN) regulates melatonin and temperature and typically produces melatonin at night. Melatonin informs the body when it is time to sleep.

When circadian cycles become disrupted (due either to too little light or too much light at the wrong time of day), melatonin is produced at disrupted times. This causes an individual to experience disrupted sleep patterns, which in turn causes numerous health issues to arise.

The key external stimulus is variation in light and darkness over the course of the day. The elderly are at high risk for physical ailments when their circadian cycles are disrupted. Impairment of these SCN-mediated circadian rhythms becomes increasingly common with advancing age, diminished health, and Alzheimer's disease, thereby contributing to the high prevalence of sleep disturbances in these populations.

=== Sleep disorders ===
Surveys show that 40 to 70 percent of those 65 years old and older suffer from chronic sleep disturbances. The elderly tend to go to bed early in the evening and wake earlier in the morning than younger adults. Furthermore, the elderly often wake several times throughout the night and have difficulty falling asleep. They are prone to taking numerous naps during the day. Furthermore, constant lighting in assisted living facilities has been demonstrated to impair sleep ability.

In persons with Alzheimer's Disease, sleep disturbances are much more frequent and tend to be more severe. These patients exhibit intermittent sleep throughout the 24-hour day, instead of consolidated sleep at night and wakefulness during the day.

Poor sleep is one of the largest complaints among the elderly, and poor sleep can be linked to a wide variety of problems including increased cardiovascular problems, disruption of endocrine functions, decline of immune functions, stability problems, and poor cognition. Studies have shown that when the elderly are exposed to high circadian light levels during the day and dim circadian levels at night, their sleep duration and efficiency has significantly improved.

=== Depression ===
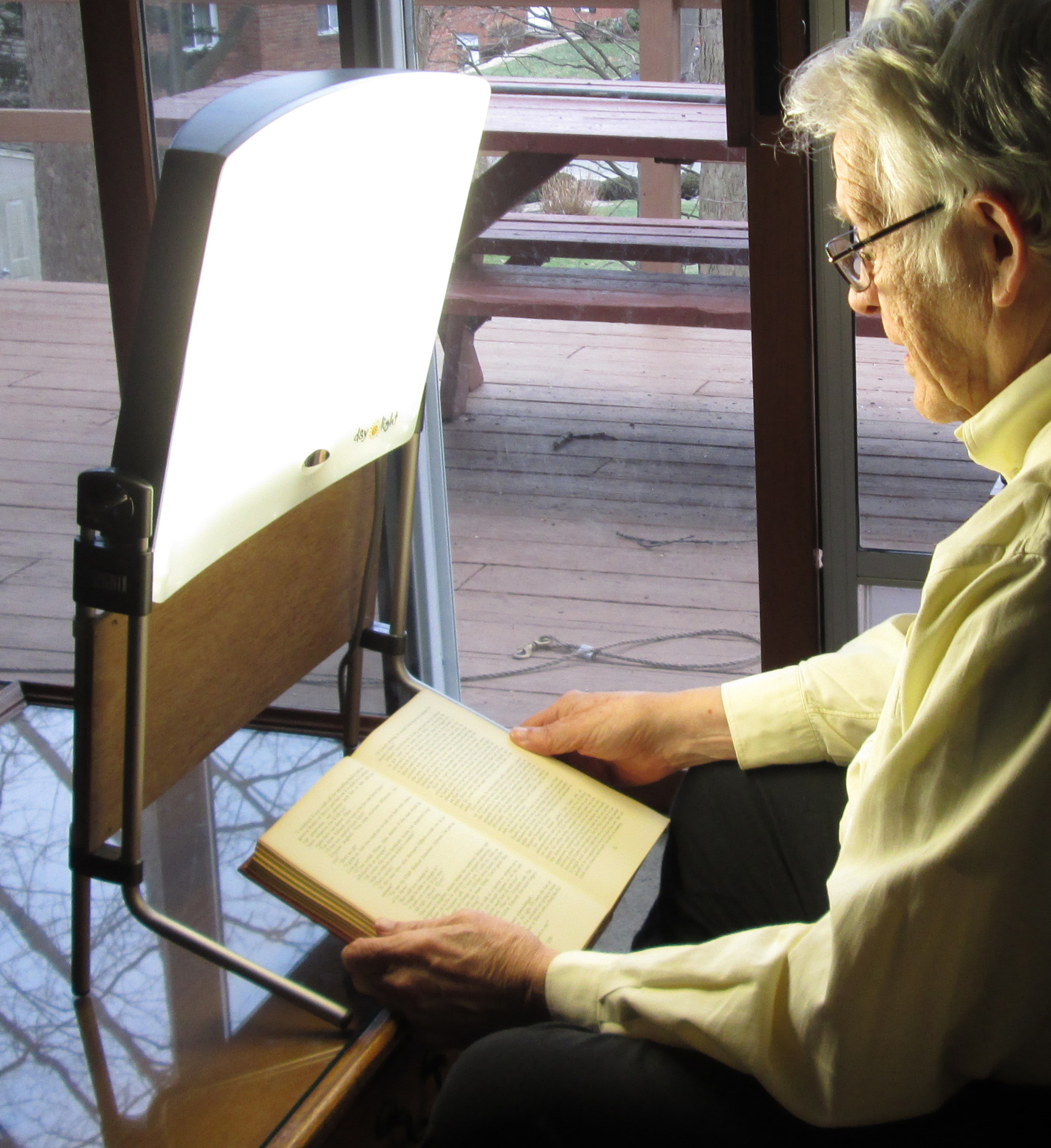
Bright light therapy is a common treatment for seasonal affective disorder and for circadian rhythm sleep disorders

The elderly frequently cite depression as a notable ailment. Many researchers have linked the depression to seasonal affective disorder (SAD), and seasonal mood variations have been linked to lack of light. (SAD is markedly more frequent in extreme latitudes, such as the arctic and in Finland). Light therapy in the form of light boxes are a frequent non-drug treatment for SAD. Several preliminary studies have shown that light therapy is a positive treatment for depressive symptoms for older persons although more studies need to be done in this area.

== Measuring light ==
Typical measurements of light have used a Dosimeter. Dosimeters measure an individual's or an object's exposure to something in the environment, such as light dosimeters and ultraviolet dosimeters.

In order to specifically measure the amount of light entering the eye, personal circadian light meter called the Daysimeter has been developed. This is the first device created to accurately measure and characterize light (intensity, spectrum, timing, and duration) entering the eye that affects the human body's clock.

The device is a small, head-mounted device which measures an individual's daily rest and activity patterns, as well as exposure to circadian light—short-wavelength light, particularly natural light from the blue sky—that stimulates the circadian system. The device measures activity and light together at regular time intervals and electronically stores and logs its operating temperature. The Daysimeter can gather data for up to 30 days for analysis.

== Applications ==
Providing light early in the evening can help seniors sleep better at night and be more alert during the day because the light delays the biological, circadian clock. Many studies have shown that when the elderly are exposed to bright white light, the elderly individual saw improved sleep efficiency. A recent study also demonstrated that exposure to 30 lx of blue light from LEDs in the evening (peaking at 470 nm at the eye for two hours) increased sleep efficiency for older adults who previously had difficulty sleeping.

Providing white light and blue light has even greater impact for those with Alzheimer's disease (AD). So far, two lighting methods have been shown to improve nighttime sleep in AD patients: (1) exposure to bright white light (at least 2500 lx and as high as 8000 lx at the cornea) for at least one hour in the morning, for two weeks and (2) exposure to 30 lx of blue light from LEDs, peaking at 470 nm at the eye for two hours. The light, or the better sleep, also helped to reduce agitated behavior such as pacing, aggressiveness, and speaking loudly. Evening exposure to bright white light (1500 to 2000 lx at the cornea) for two hours decreased nocturnal activity and severity of evening agitation.

Daylight is an ideal light source because it provides high circadian stimulation during the day. Daylight also has the correct intensity and spectrum needed to stimulate the circadian systems. Architectural designs should consider adding sun rooms, skylights, patios, and courtyards into the design of facilities for the elderly. Architects can also select lighting fixtures that emit an array of blue light LEDS (λmax=470 nm) which deliver at least 30 lux at the corner. Lighting schemes that have timers are also helpful in providing the right type of light at the right type of day.

Nightlights are also helpful in reducing falls and injuries and, at the same time, help the elderly to maintain sleep. Falls are a major concern with the elderly; they threaten their independence and risk further health complications. Lighting systems can help seniors maintain balance and stability. Furthermore, sleep deprivation can contribute to decreased postural control. Nightlights that accent horizontal and vertical spaces, such as soft lighting above a doorway or at the foot of a bed, can reduce the risk of falls without disturbing sleep.

== See also ==
- Architectural lighting design – Field within architecture, interior design and electrical engineering
- Fluorescent lamps and health
- Landscape lighting – Outdoor illumination of gardens and landscapes
- Lighting designer – Design of lighting systems to meet objectives
- Lighting ergonomics
- Transgenerational design – Making products and environments compatible with human aging
- Vitamin D – Essential nutrient
