= Lighting =

Deliberate use of light to achieve practical or aesthetic effects

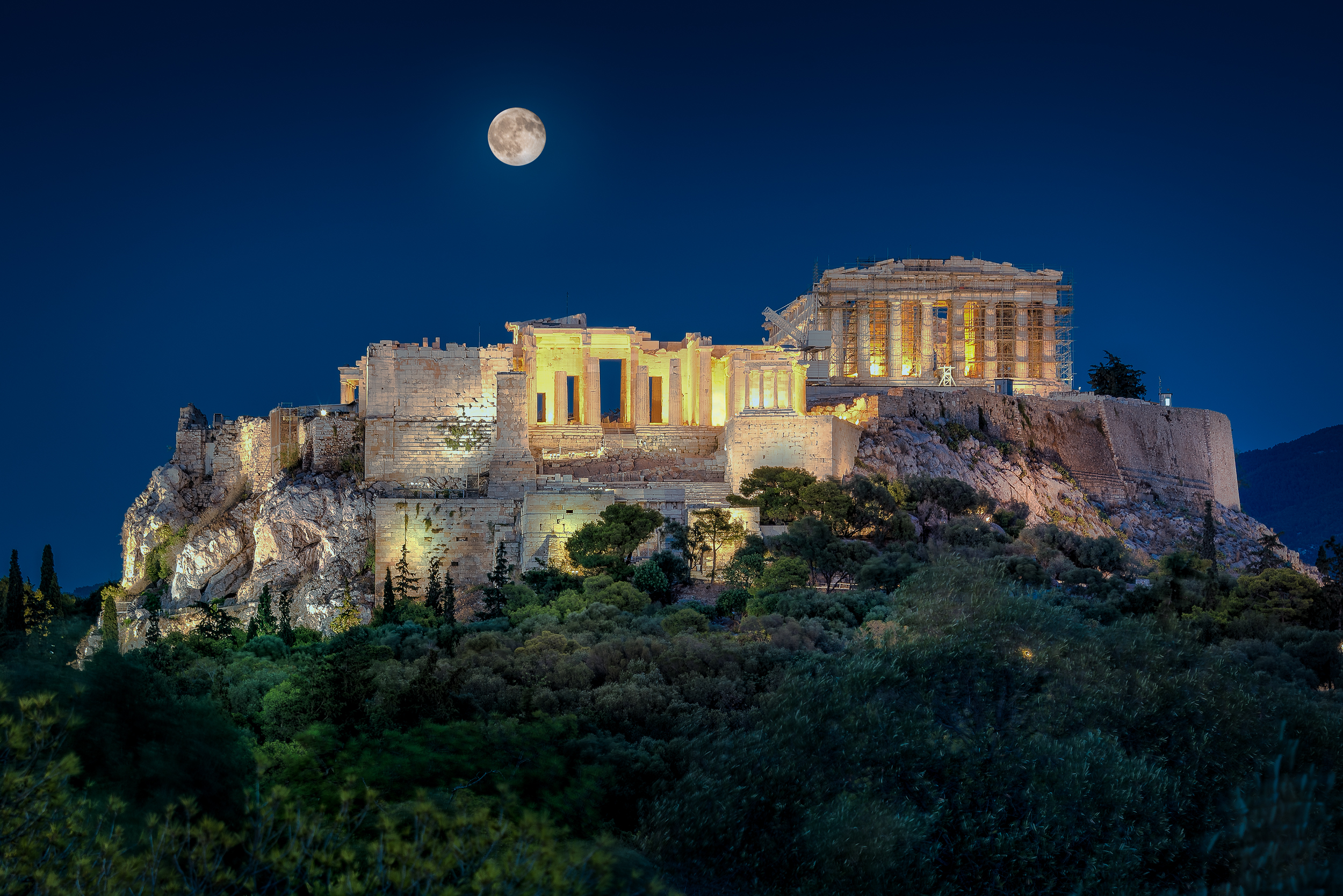
Acropolis of Athens illuminated at night

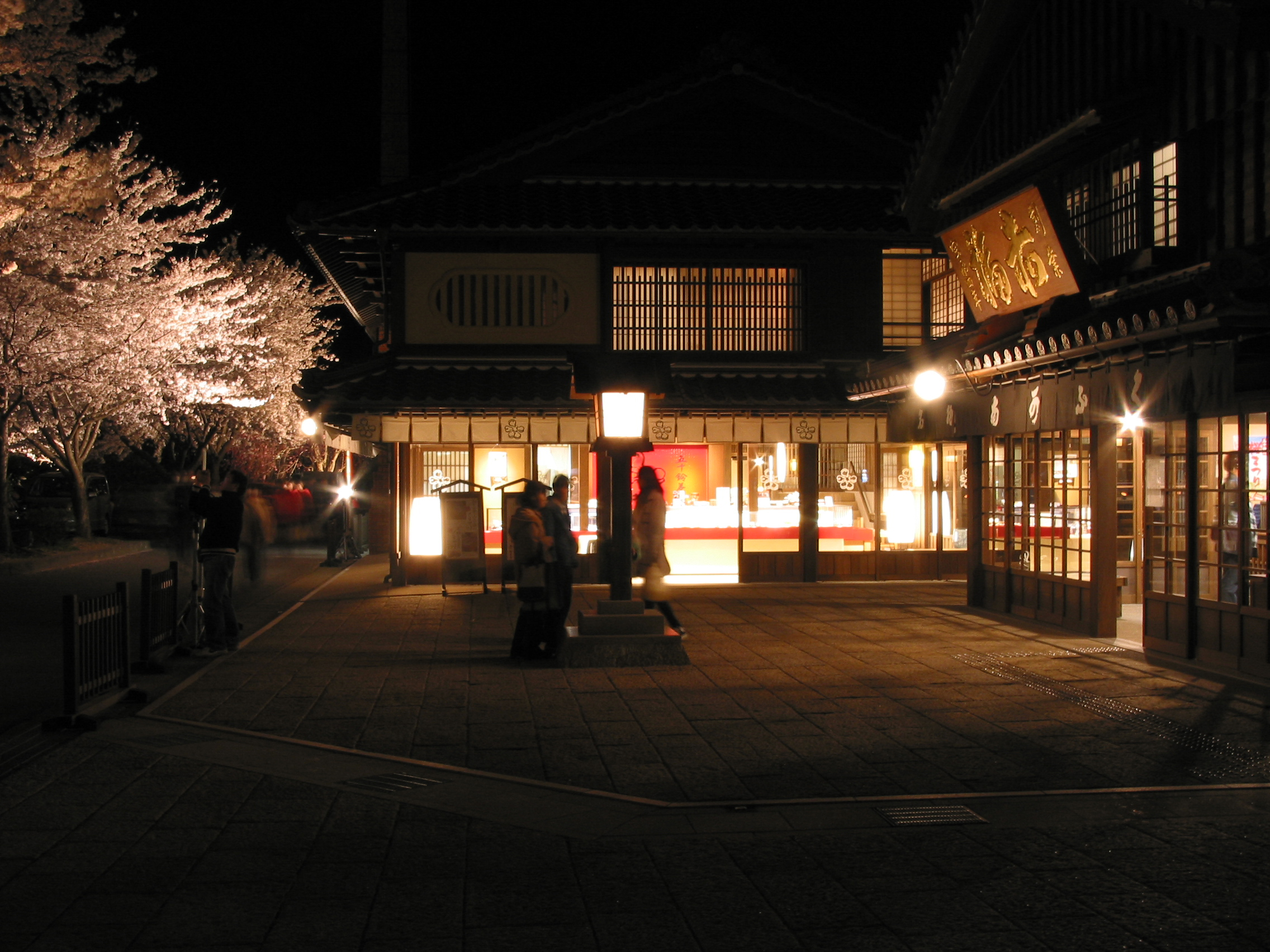
Illuminated cherry blossoms, light from the shop windows, and Japanese lantern at night in Ise, Mie, Japan

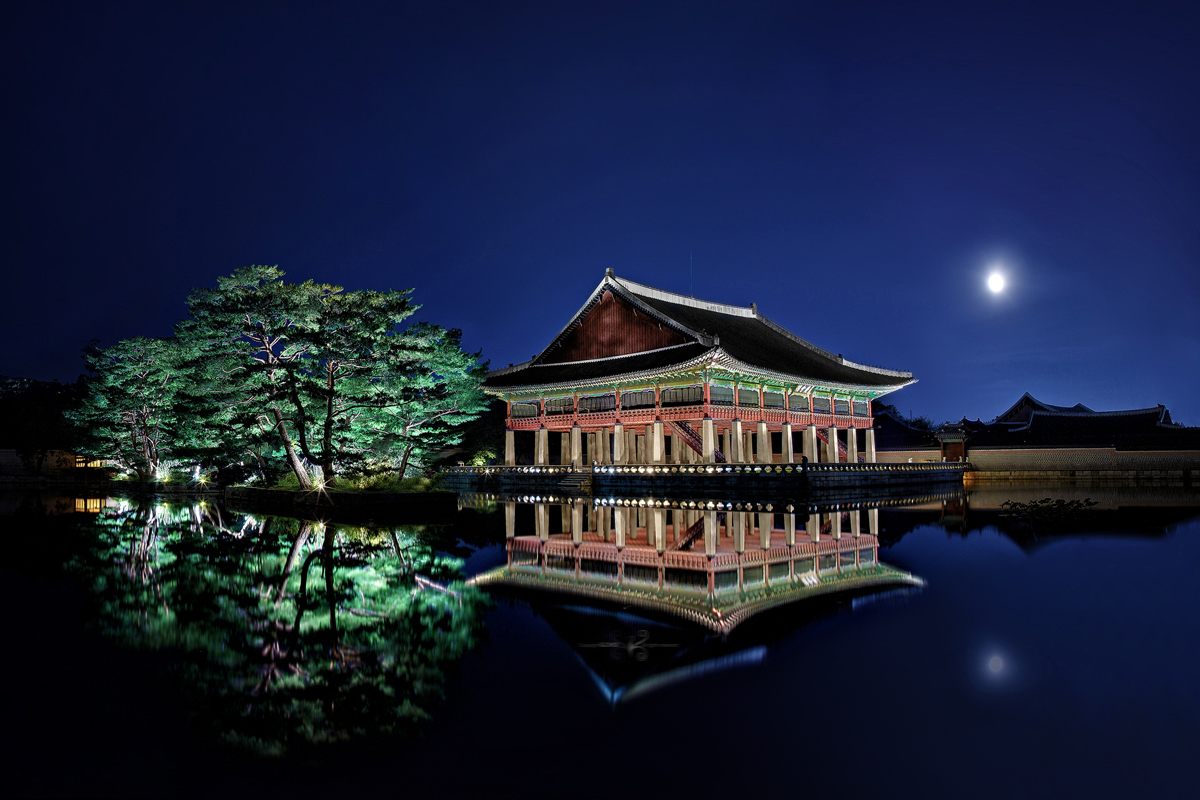
The lights illuminating Gyeonghoeru at Gyeongbokgung Palace in Seoul, Korea

Lighting or illumination is the deliberate use of light to achieve practical or aesthetic effects. Lighting includes the use of both artificial light sources like lamps and light fixtures, as well as natural illumination by capturing daylight. Daylighting (using windows, skylights, or light shelves) is sometimes used as the main source of light during daytime in buildings. This can save energy in place of using artificial lighting, which represents a major component of energy consumption in buildings. Proper lighting can enhance task performance, improve the appearance of an area, or have positive psychological effects on occupants.

Indoor lighting is usually accomplished using light fixtures, and is a key part of interior design. Lighting can also be an intrinsic component of landscape projects.

== History ==
With the discovery of fire, the earliest form of artificial lighting used to illuminate an area were campfires or torches. As early as 400,000 years ago, fire was kindled in the caves of Peking Man. Prehistoric people used primitive oil lamps to illuminate surroundings. These lamps were made from naturally occurring materials such as rocks, shells, horns and stones, were filled with grease, and had a fiber wick. Lamps typically used animal or vegetable fats as fuel. Hundreds of these lamps (hollow worked stones) have been found in the Lascaux caves in modern-day France, dating to about 15,000 years ago. Oily animals (birds and fish) were also used as lamps after being threaded with a wick. Fireflies have been used as lighting sources. Candles and glass and pottery lamps were also invented. Chandeliers were an early form of "light fixture".

A major reduction in the cost of lighting occurred with the discovery of whale oil. The use of whale oil declined after Abraham Gesner, a Canadian geologist, first refined kerosene in the 1840s, allowing brighter light to be produced at substantially lower cost. In the 1850s, the price of whale oil dramatically increased (more than doubling from 1848 to 1856) due to shortages of available whales, hastening whale oil's decline. By 1860, there were 33 kerosene plants in the United States, and Americans spent more on gas and kerosene than on whale oil. The final death knell for whale oil was in 1859, when crude oil was discovered and the petroleum industry arose.

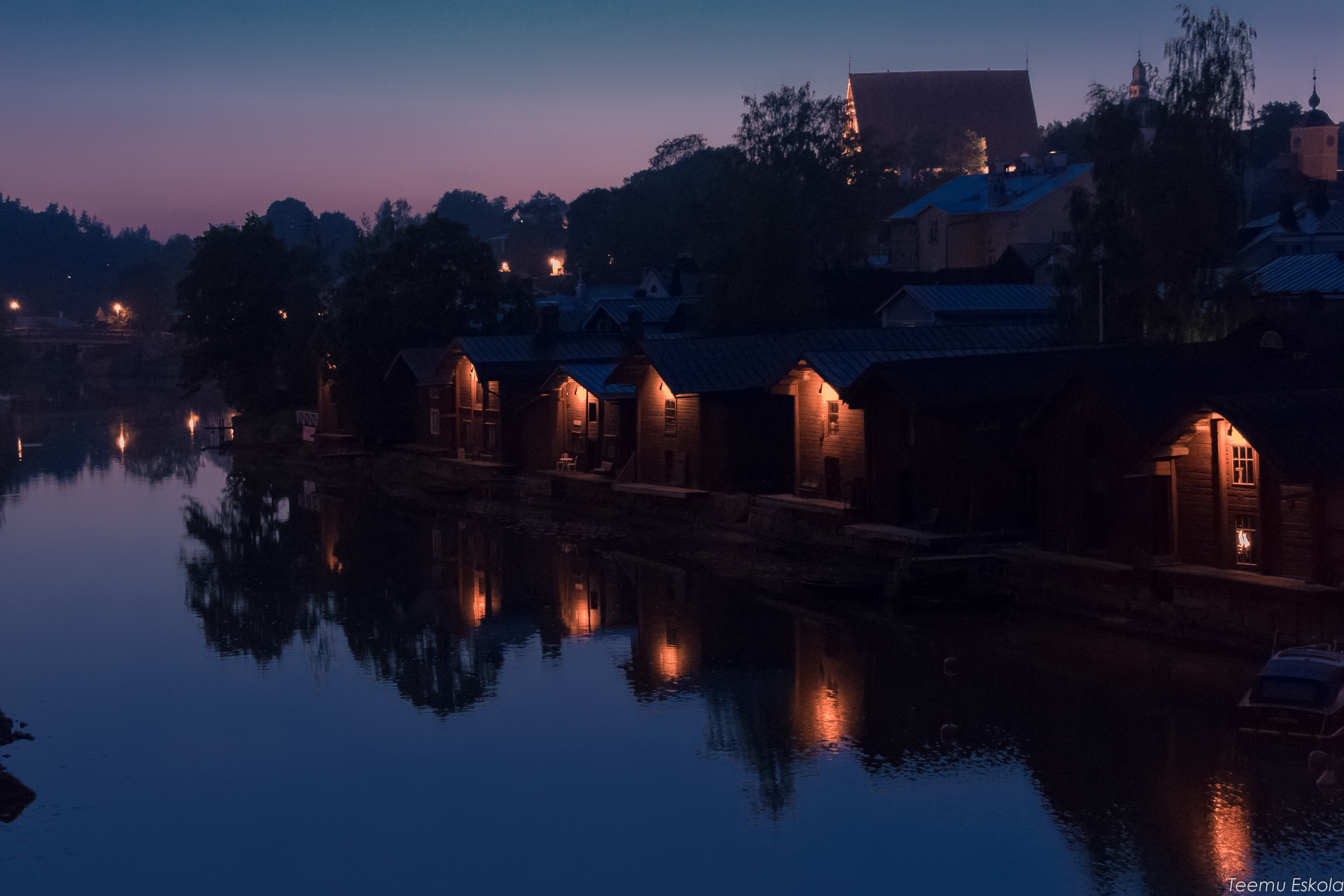
Dim night lighting for the old warehouses along the river in the old town of Porvoo, Finland

Gas lighting was economical enough to power street lights in major cities starting in the early 1800s, and was also used in some commercial buildings and in the homes of wealthy people. The gas mantle boosted the luminosity of utility lighting and of kerosene lanterns. The next major drop in price came about in the 1880s with the introduction of electric lighting in the form of arc lights for large space and street lighting, followed by incandescent light bulb-based utilities for indoor and outdoor lighting. Over time, electric lighting became ubiquitous in developed countries. Segmented sleep patterns disappeared, improved nighttime lighting made more activities possible at night, and more street lights reduced urban crime.

== Fixtures ==
Lighting fixtures come in a wide variety of styles for various functions. The most important functions are as a holder for the light source, to provide directed light and to avoid visual glare. Some are very plain and functional, while some are pieces of art in themselves. Nearly any material can be used, so long as it can tolerate the excess heat and is in keeping with safety codes. An important property of light fixtures is the luminous efficacy or wall-plug efficiency, meaning the amount of usable light emanating from the fixture per used energy, usually measured in lumen per watt. A fixture using replaceable light sources can also have its efficiency quoted as the percentage of light passed from the "bulb" to the surroundings. The more transparent the lighting fixtures are, the higher efficacy. Shading the light will normally decrease efficacy but increase the directionality and the visual comfort probability.

Color temperature for white light sources also affects their use for certain applications. The color temperature of a white light source is the temperature in kelvins of a theoretical black body emitter that most closely matches the spectral characteristics (spectral power distribution) of the lamp. An incandescent bulb has a color temperature around 2800 to 3000 kelvins; daylight is around 6400 kelvins. Lower color temperature lamps have relatively more energy in the yellow and red part of the visible spectrum, while high color temperatures correspond to lamps with more of a blue-white appearance. For critical inspection or color matching tasks, or for retail displays of food and clothing, the color temperature of the lamps will be selected for the best overall lighting effect.

=== Types ===
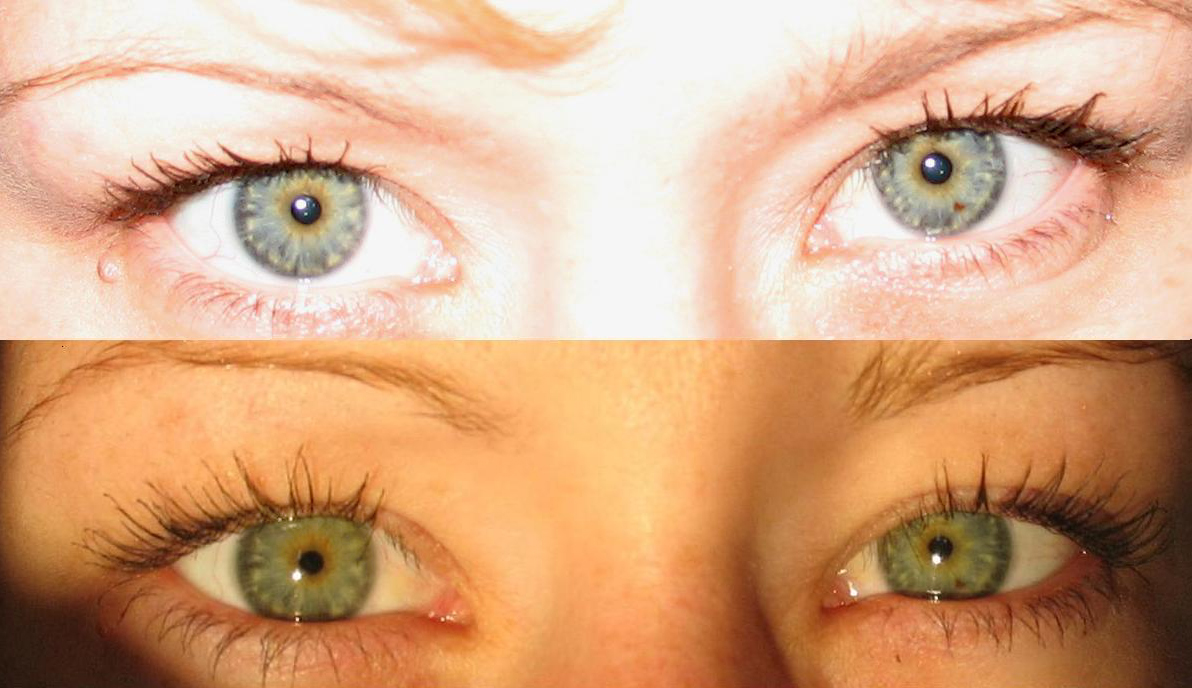
A demonstration of the effects of different kinds of lighting

Lighting is classified by intended use as general, accent, or task lighting, depending largely on the distribution of the light produced by the fixture.

- Task lighting is mainly functional and is usually the most concentrated, for purposes such as reading or inspection of materials. For example, reading poor-quality reproductions may require task lighting levels up to 1500 lux (140 footcandles), and some inspection tasks or surgical procedures require even higher levels.
- Accent lighting is mainly decorative, intended to highlight pictures, plants, or other elements of interior design or landscaping.

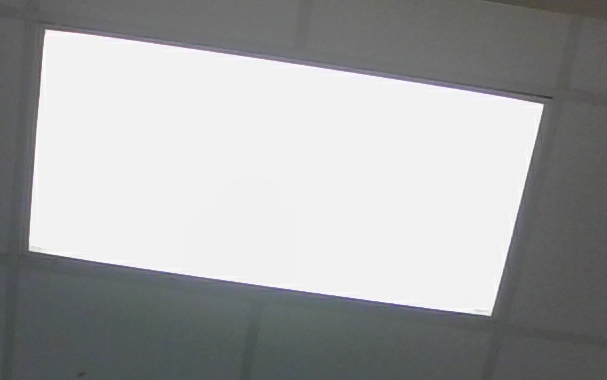
A ceiling light fixture

- General lighting (sometimes referred to as ambient light) fills in between the two and is intended for general illumination of an area. Indoors, this would be a basic lamp on a table or floor, or a fixture on the ceiling. Outdoors, general lighting for a parking lot may be as low as 10-20 lux (1-2 footcandles) since pedestrians and motorists already used to the dark will need little light for crossing the area.

=== Methods ===
- Downlighting is most common, with fixtures on or recessed in the ceiling casting light downward. This tends to be the most used method, used in both offices and homes. Although it is easy to design, it has dramatic problems with glare and excess energy consumption due to large number of fittings. The introduction of LED lighting has greatly improved this by approx. 90% when compared to a halogen downlight or spotlight. LED lamps or bulbs are now available to retro fit in place of high energy consumption lamps.
- Uplighting is less common, often used to bounce indirect light off the ceiling and back down. It is commonly used in lighting applications that require minimal glare and uniform general illuminance levels. Uplighting (indirect) uses a diffuse surface to reflect light in a space and can minimize disabling glare on computer displays and other dark glossy surfaces. It gives a more uniform presentation of the light output in operation. However indirect lighting is completely reliant upon the reflectance value of the surface. While indirect lighting can create a diffused and shadow free light effect it can be regarded as an uneconomical lighting principle.
- Front lighting is also quite common, but tends to make the subject look flat as its casts almost no visible shadows. Lighting from the side is the less common, as it tends to produce glare near eye level.
- Backlighting either around or through an object is mainly for accent. Backlighting is used to illuminate a background or backdrop. This adds depth to an image or scene. Others use it to achieve a more dramatic effect.

=== Forms of lighting ===
==== Indoor lighting ====
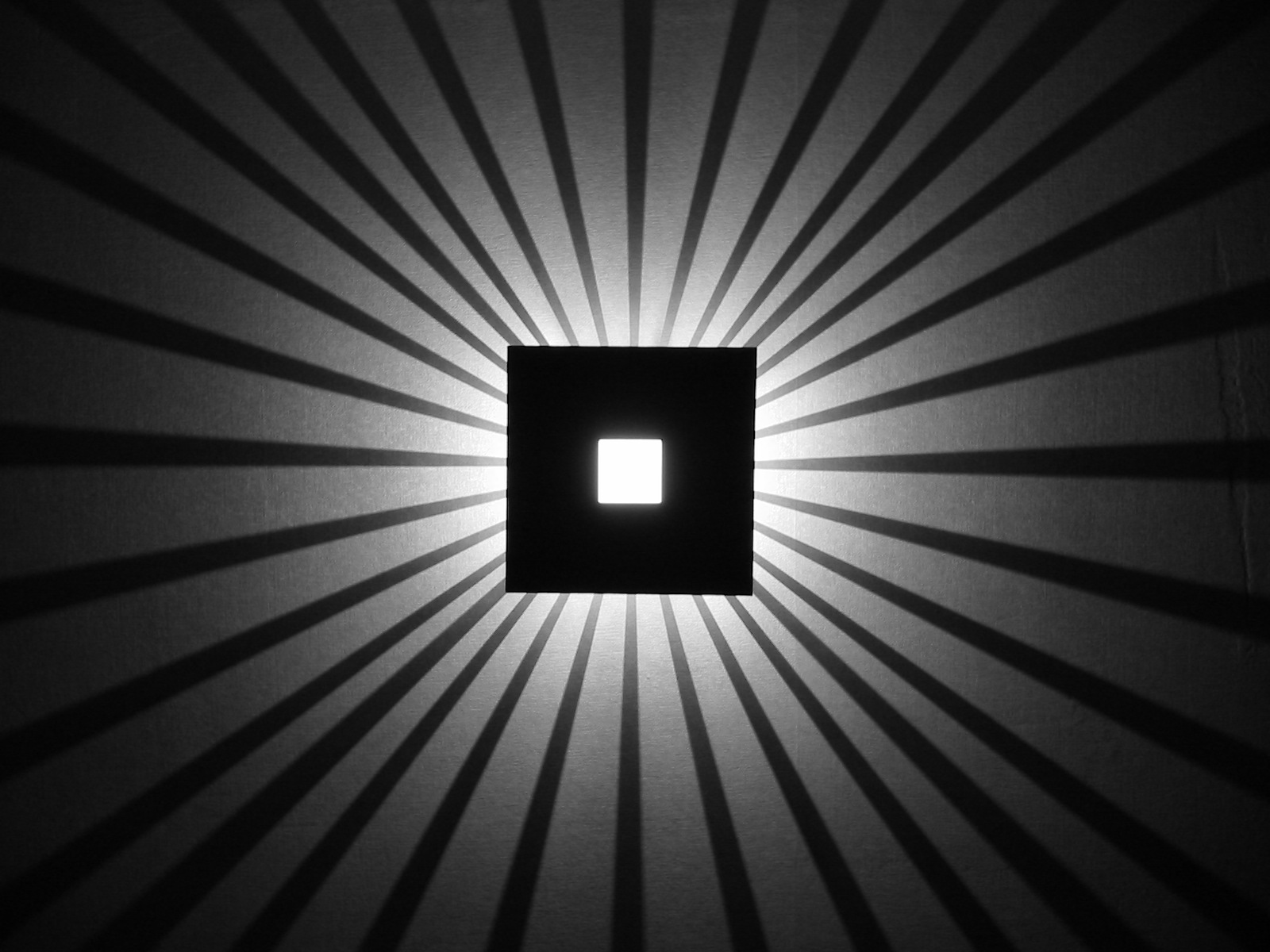
Wall-mounted light with shadows

Forms of lighting include alcove lighting, which like most other uplighting is indirect. This is often done with fluorescent lighting (first available at the 1939 World's Fair) or rope light, occasionally with neon lighting, and recently with LED strip lighting. It is a form of backlighting.

Soffit or close to wall lighting can be general or a decorative wall-wash, sometimes used to bring out texture (like stucco or plaster) on a wall, though this may also show its defects as well. The effect depends heavily on the exact type of lighting source used. Recessed lighting (often called "pot lights" in Canada, "can lights" or 'high hats" in the US) is popular, with fixtures mounted into the ceiling structure so as to appear flush with it. These downlights can use narrow beam spotlights, or wider-angle floodlights, both of which are bulbs having their own reflectors. There are also downlights with internal reflectors designed to accept common 'A' lamps (light bulbs) which are generally less costly than reflector lamps. Downlights can be incandescent, fluorescent, HID (high intensity discharge) or LED. Track lighting, invented by Lightolier, was popular at one period of time because it was much easier to install than recessed lighting, and individual fixtures are decorative and can be easily aimed at a wall. It has regained some popularity recently in low-voltage tracks, which often look nothing like their predecessors because they do not have the safety issues that line-voltage systems have, and are therefore less bulky and more ornamental in themselves. A master transformer feeds all of the fixtures on the track or rod with 12 or 24 volts, instead of each light fixture having its own line-to-low voltage transformer. There are traditional spots and floods, as well as other small hanging fixtures. A modified version of this is cable lighting, where lights are hung from or clipped to bare metal cables under tension. A sconce is a wall-mounted fixture, particularly one that shines up and sometimes down as well. A torchère is an uplight intended for ambient lighting. It is typically a floor lamp but may be wall-mounted like a sconce. Further interior light fixtures include chandeliers, pendant lights, ceiling fans with lights, close-to-ceiling or flush lights, and various types of lamps The portable or table lamp is probably the most common fixture, found in many homes and offices. The standard lamp and shade that sits on a table is general lighting, while the desk lamp is considered task lighting. Magnifier lamps are also task lighting.

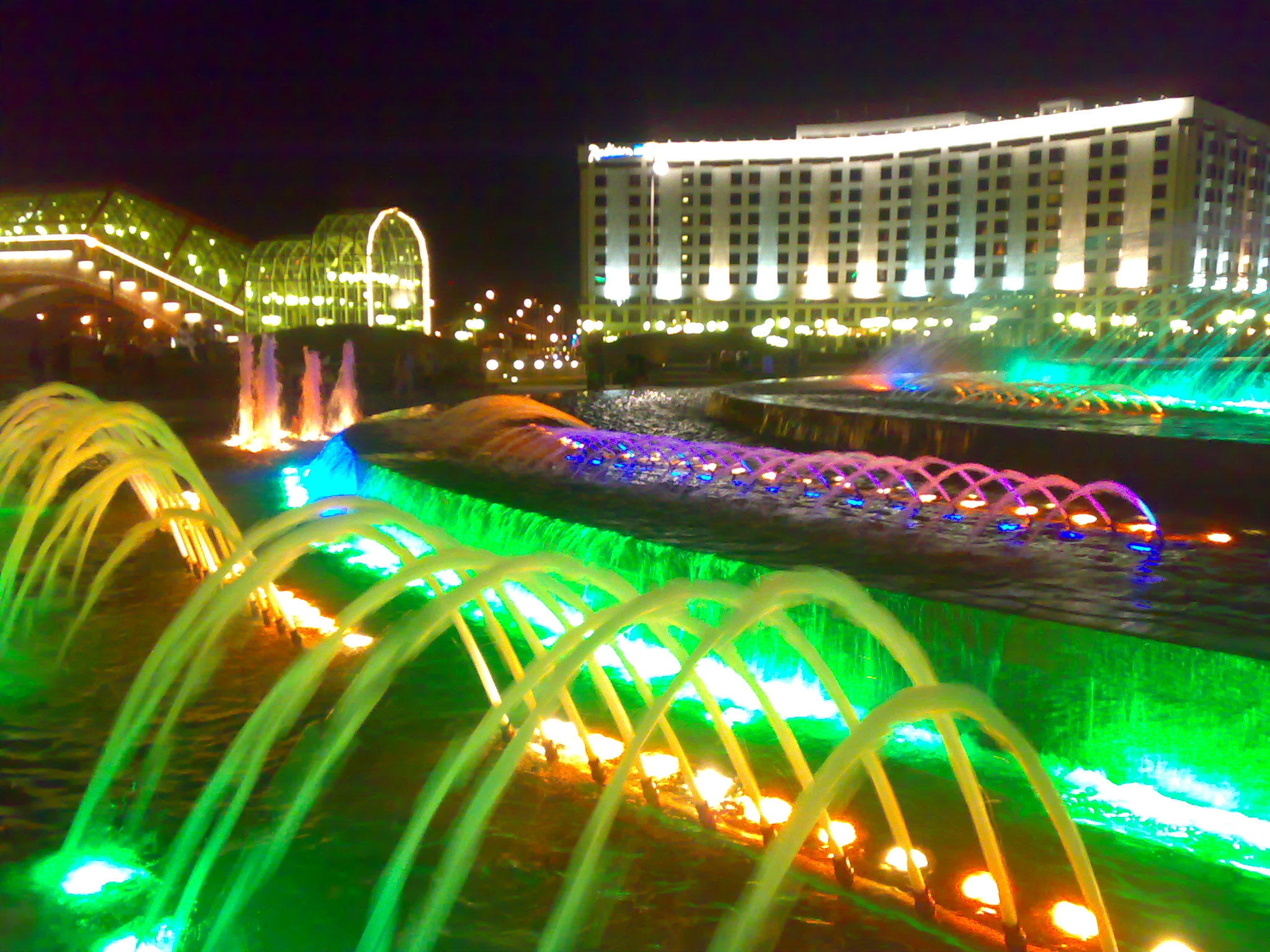
Animated fountain in Moscow's Square of Europe, lit at night

The illuminated ceiling was once popular in the 1960s and 1970s but fell out of favor after the 1980s. This uses diffuser panels hung like a suspended ceiling below fluorescent lights, and is considered general lighting. Other forms include neon, which is not usually intended to illuminate anything else, but to actually be an artwork in itself. This would probably fall under accent lighting, though in a dark nightclub it could be considered general lighting.

In a movie theater, steps in the aisles are usually marked with a row of small lights for convenience and safety, when the film has started and the other lights are off. Traditionally made up of small low wattage, low-voltage lamps in a track or translucent tube, these are rapidly being replaced with LED based versions.

==== Outdoor lighting ====
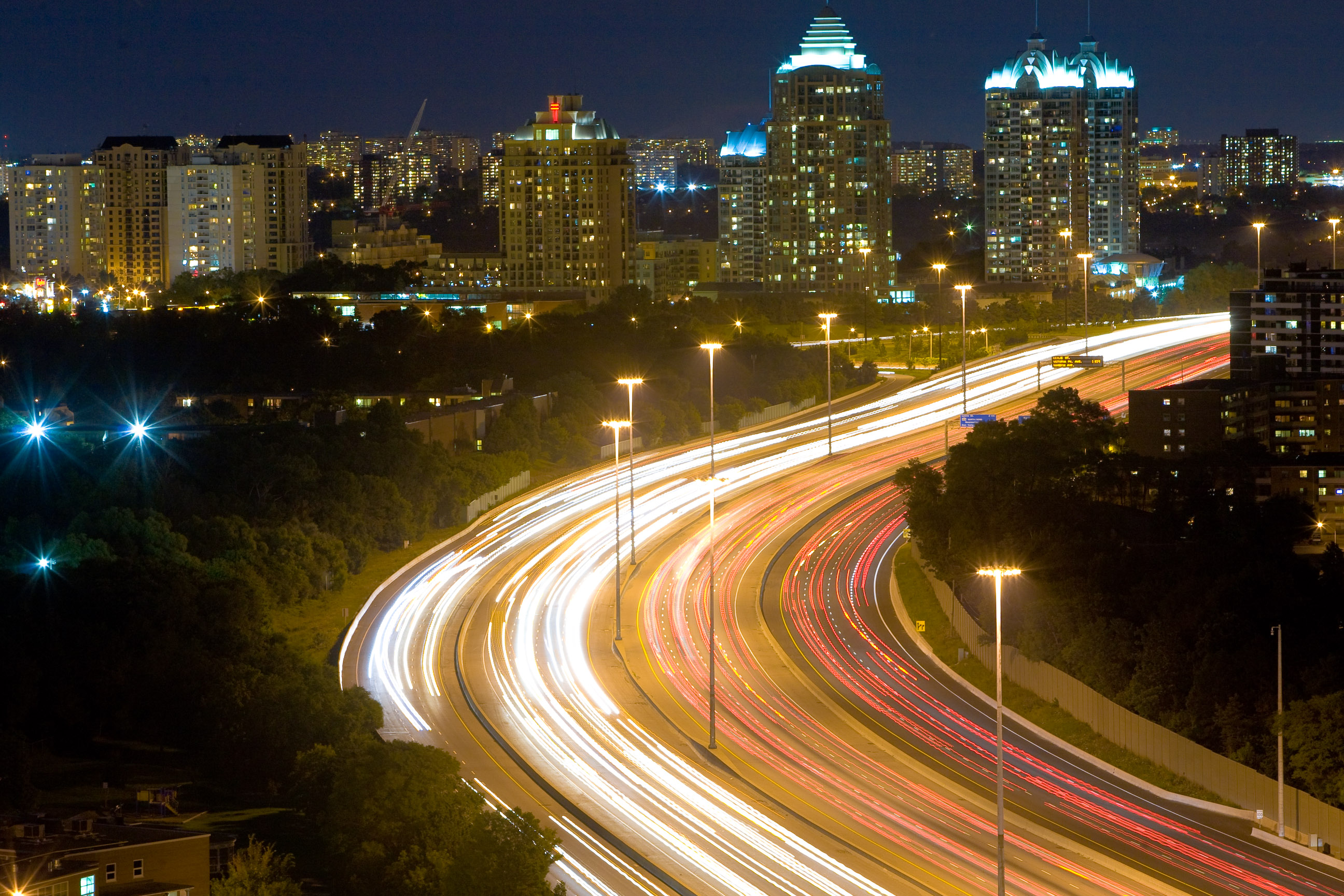
High mast lighting along Highway 401 in Ontario, Canada

Outdoor light is used for a number of purposes, including lighting areas (functional lighting), advertising, and decoration. A large-scale study in Germany in 2021 found that the most common light source in public areas was leakage from private windows (48%), followed by street and path lights (12.8%), commercial shop windows (7.4%), signs (5.6%), and lights mounted on the exterior sides of buildings (5.3%).

Street lights are used to light roadways and walkways at night. Floodlights can be used to illuminate work zones or outdoor playing fields during nighttime hours.

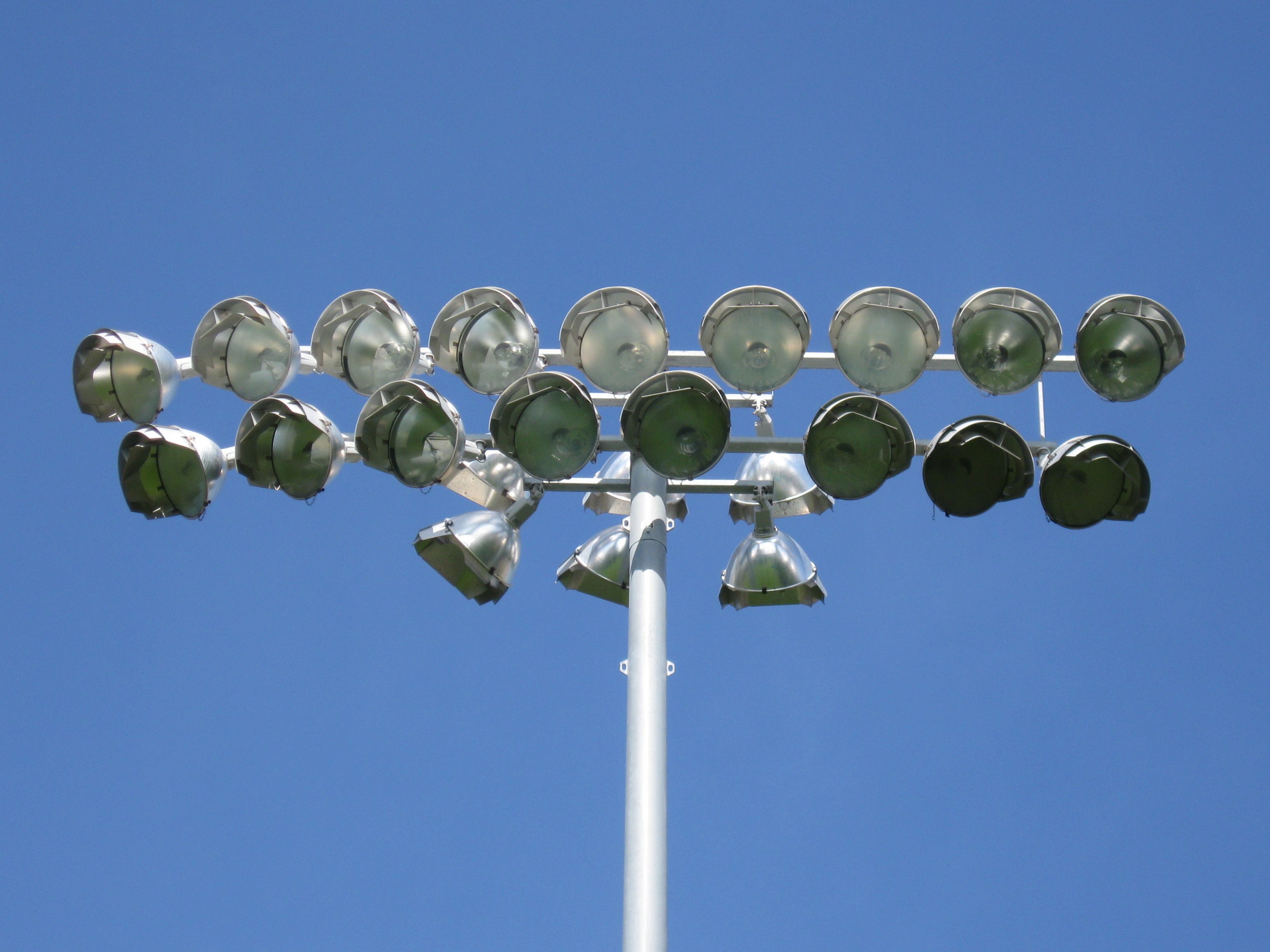
Floodlights are used to illuminate outdoor playing fields or work zones during nighttime.

Beacon lights are positioned at the intersection of two roads to aid in navigation. Security lighting is installed with the intention of preventing crime, and is often extremely bright. Entry lights are often used outside to illuminate and signal the entrance to a property, and are sometimes installed for decorative purposes. Underwater accent lighting is sometimes used for koi ponds, fountains, swimming pools and the like.

All forms of outdoor lighting contribute to light pollution, although some lighting practices are associated with greater environmental impacts than others.

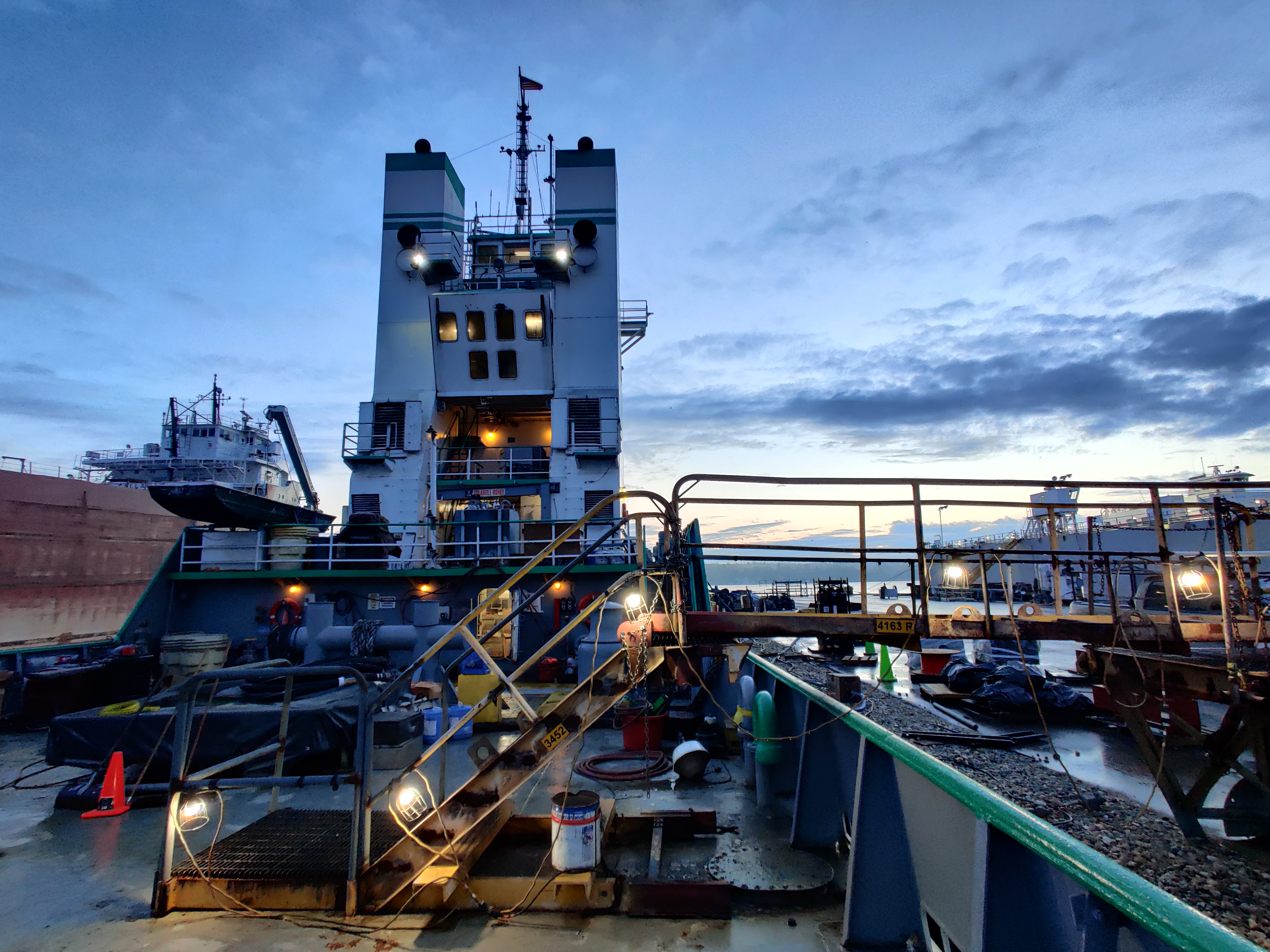
The decks and gangway of tugboat Samuel de Champlain illuminated at night while docked at a shipyard for the purposes of safety and security

== Fixture components ==
=== Lamps ===
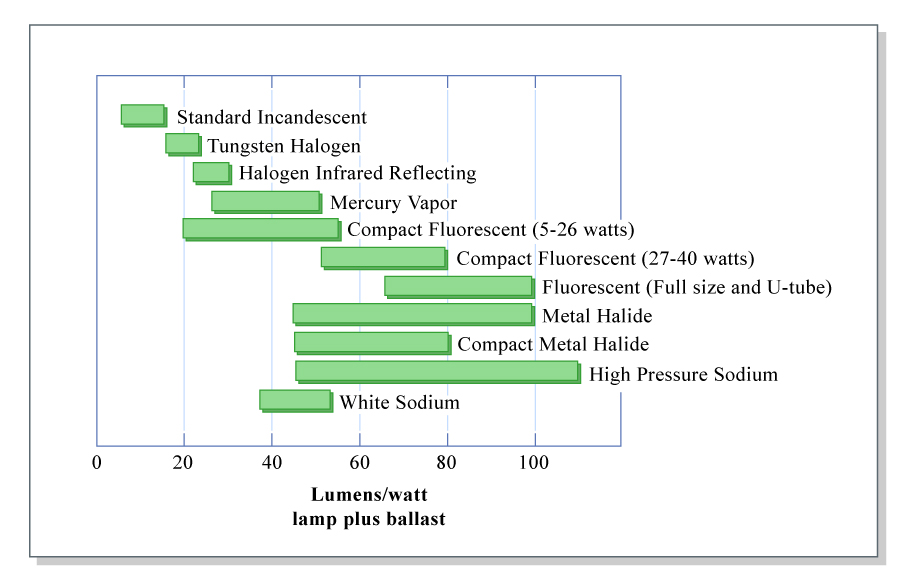
Graph of the efficacy of different types of lighting.

Commonly called 'light bulbs', lamps are the removable and replaceable part of a light fixture, which converts electrical energy into electromagnetic radiation. While lamps have traditionally been rated and marketed primarily in terms of their power consumption, expressed in watts, proliferation of lighting technology beyond the incandescent light bulb has eliminated the correspondence of wattage to the amount of light produced. For example, a 60 W incandescent light bulb produces about the same amount of light as a 13 W compact fluorescent lamp. Each of these technologies has a different efficacy in converting electrical energy to visible light. Visible light output is typically measured in lumens. This unit only quantifies the visible radiation, and excludes invisible infrared and ultraviolet light. A wax candle produces on the close order of 13 lumens, a 60 watt incandescent lamp makes around 700 lumens, and a 15-watt compact fluorescent lamp produces about 800 lumens, but actual output varies by specific design. Rating and marketing emphasis is shifting away from wattage and towards lumen output, to give the purchaser a directly applicable basis upon which to select a lamp.

Lamp types include:

- Fluorescent light: A tube coated with phosphor containing low pressure mercury vapor that produces white light.
- Halogen: Incandescent lamps containing halogen gases such as iodine or bromine, increasing the efficacy of the lamp versus a plain incandescent lamp.
- Neon: A low pressure gas contained within a glass tube; the color emitted depends on the gas.
- Light-emitting diodes: Light-emitting diodes (LED) are solid state devices that emit light by dint of the movement of electrons in a semiconductor material.
- Compact fluorescent lamps: CFLs are designed to replace incandescent lamps in existing and new installations.

=== Ballasts ===
Ballast: A ballast is an auxiliary piece of equipment designed to start and properly control the flow of power to discharge light sources such as fluorescent and high intensity discharge (HID) lamps. Some lamps require the ballast to have thermal protection.

== Vehicle use ==
Vehicles typically include headlamps and tail lights. Headlamps are white or selective yellow lights placed in the front of the vehicle, designed to illuminate the upcoming road and to make the vehicle more visible. Many manufactures are turning to LED headlights as an energy-efficient alternative to traditional headlamps. Tail and brake lights are red and emit light to the rear so as to reveal the vehicle's direction of travel to following drivers. White rear-facing reversing lamps indicate that the vehicle's transmission has been placed in the reverse gear, warning anyone behind the vehicle that it is moving backwards, or about to do so. Flashing turn signals on the front, side, and rear of the vehicle indicate an intended change of position or direction. In the late 1950s, some automakers began to use electroluminescent technology to backlight their cars' speedometers and other gauges or to draw attention to logos or other decorative elements.

== Lighting practice ==
=== Architectural lighting design ===
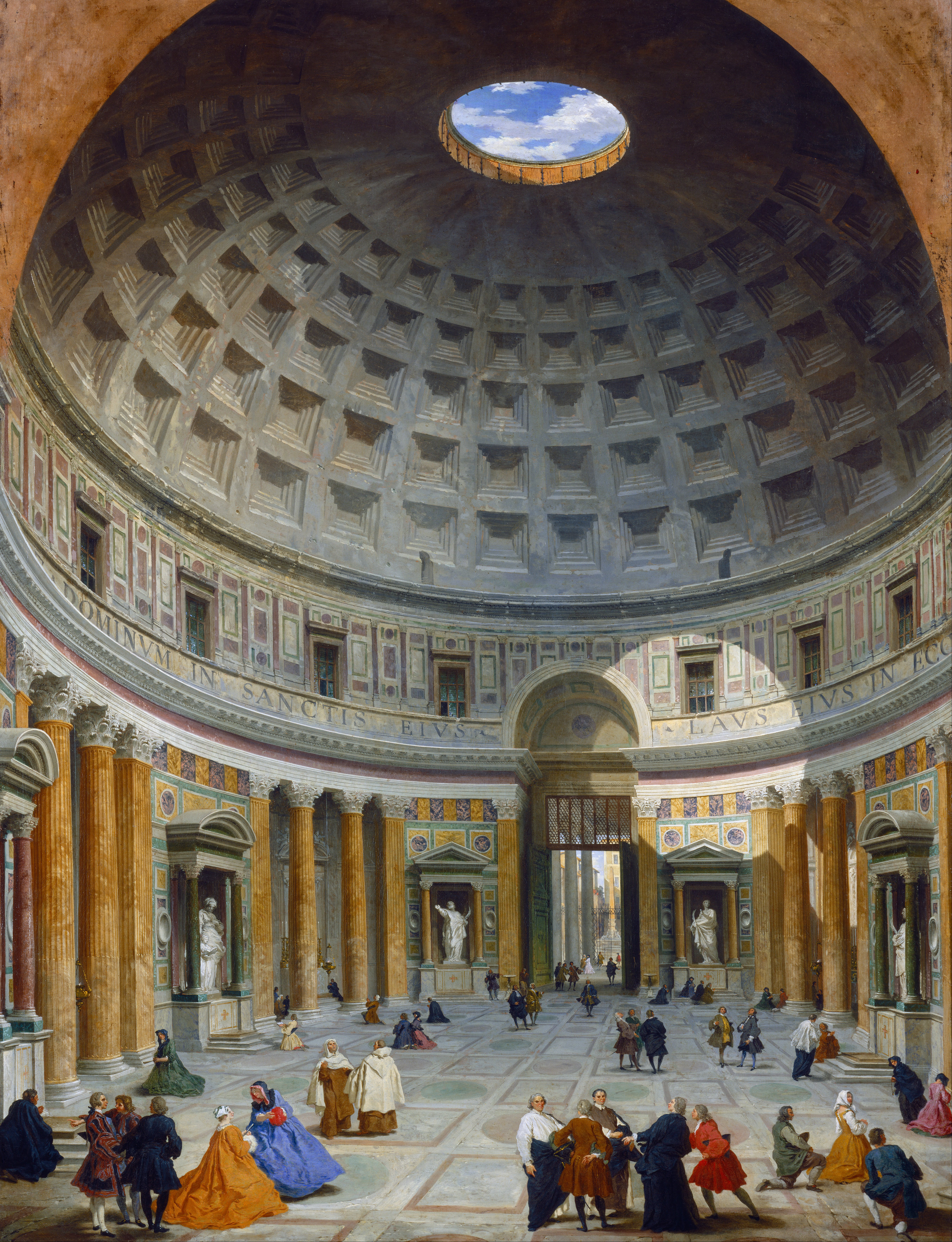
Lighting without windows: The Pantheon in the 18th century, painted by Giovanni Paolo Panini.

Lighting design as it applies to the built environment is known as 'architectural lighting design'. Some designers specialize in daylighting or outdoor lighting (e.g., landscape lighting). Lighting of structures considers aesthetic elements as well as practical considerations of quantity of light required, occupants of the structure, energy efficiency, and cost. Artificial lighting takes into account the amount of daylight received in a space by using daylight factor calculations. For simple installations, hand calculations based on tabular data are used to provide an acceptable lighting design. More critical or complex designs now routinely use computer software such as Radiance for mathematical modeling, which can allow an architect to quickly and accurately evaluate the benefit of a proposed design.

In some instances, the materials used on walls and furniture play a key role in the lighting effect. For example, dark paint tends to absorb light, making the room appear smaller and more dim than it is, whereas light paint does the opposite. Other reflective surfaces also have an effect on lighting design.

=== Stage lighting ===
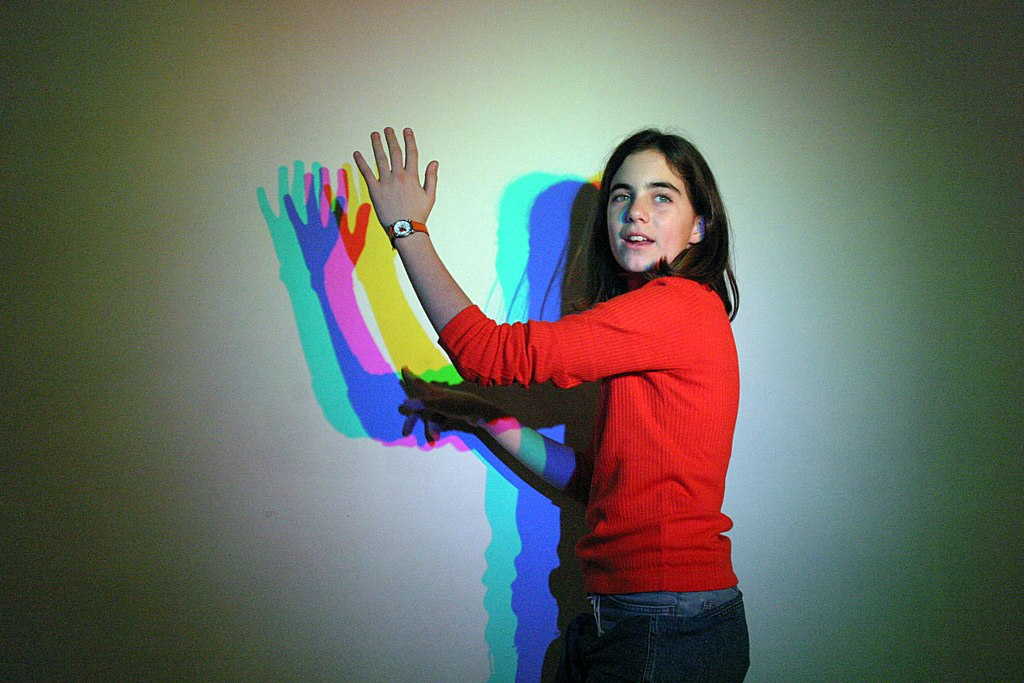
Lighting and shadows

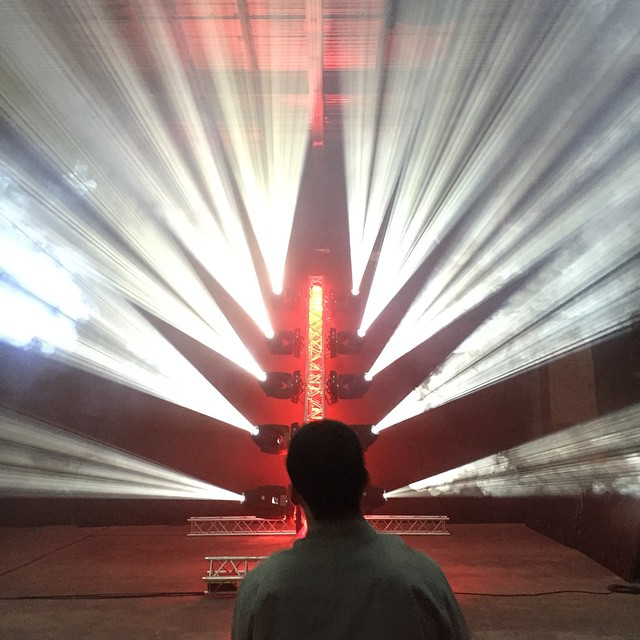
Moving heads in a photo studio set

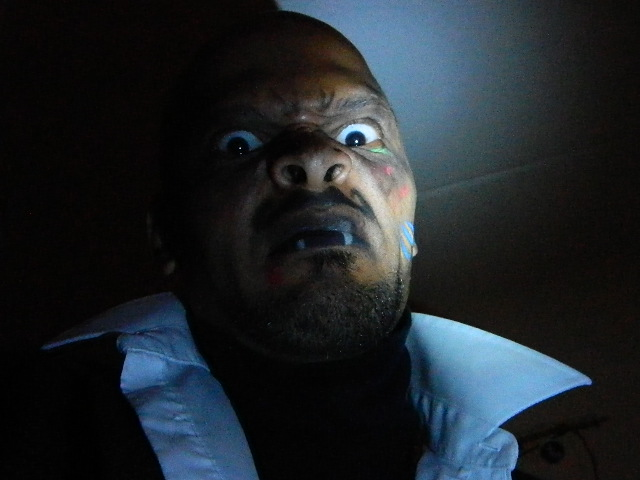
Illuminating a subject from beneath can create a heightened dramatic effect.

Lighting illuminates the performers and artists in a live theatre, dance, or musical performance, and is selected and arranged to create dramatic effects. Stage lighting uses general illumination technology in devices configured for easy adjustment of their output characteristics. The setup of stage lighting is tailored for each scene of each production. Dimmers, colored filters, reflectors, lenses, motorized or manually aimed lamps, and different kinds of flood and spot lights are among the tools used by a stage lighting designer to produce the desired effects. A set of lighting cues are prepared so that the lighting operator can control the lights in step with the performance; complex theatre lighting systems use computer control of lighting instruments.

Motion picture and television production use many of the same tools and methods of stage lighting. Especially in the early days of these industries, very high light levels were required and heat produced by lighting equipment presented substantial challenges. Modern cameras require less light, and modern light sources emit less heat.

== Measurement ==
Measurement of light or photometry is generally concerned with the amount of useful light falling on a surface and the amount of light emerging from a lamp or other source, along with the colors that can be rendered by this light. The human eye responds differently to light from different parts of the visible spectrum, therefore photometric measurements must take the luminosity function into account when measuring the amount of useful light. The basic SI unit of measurement is the candela (cd), which describes the luminous intensity, all other photometric units are derived from the candela. Luminance for instance is a measure of the density of luminous intensity in a given direction. It describes the amount of light that passes through or is emitted from a particular area, and falls within a given solid angle. The SI unit for luminance is candela per square metre (cd/m^{2}). The CGS unit of luminance is the stilb, which is equal to one candela per square centimetre or 10 kcd/m^{2}. The amount of useful light emitted from a source or the luminous flux is measured in lumen (lm).

The SI unit of illuminance and luminous emittance, being the luminous power per area, is measured in Lux. It is used in photometry as a measure of the intensity, as perceived by the human eye, of light that hits or passes through a surface. It is analogous to the radiometric unit watts per square metre, but with the power at each wavelength weighted according to the luminosity function, a standardized model of human visual brightness perception. In English, "lux" is used in both singular and plural.

Visual comfort often entails the measurement of subjective evaluations. Several measurement methods have been developed to control glare resulting from indoor lighting design. The Unified Glare Rating (UGR), the Visual Comfort Probability, and the Daylight Glare Index are some of the most well-known methods of measurement. In addition to these new methods, four main factors influence the degree of discomfort glare; the luminance of the glare source, the solid angle of the glare source, the background luminance, and the position of the glare source in the field of view must all be taken into account.

=== Color properties ===
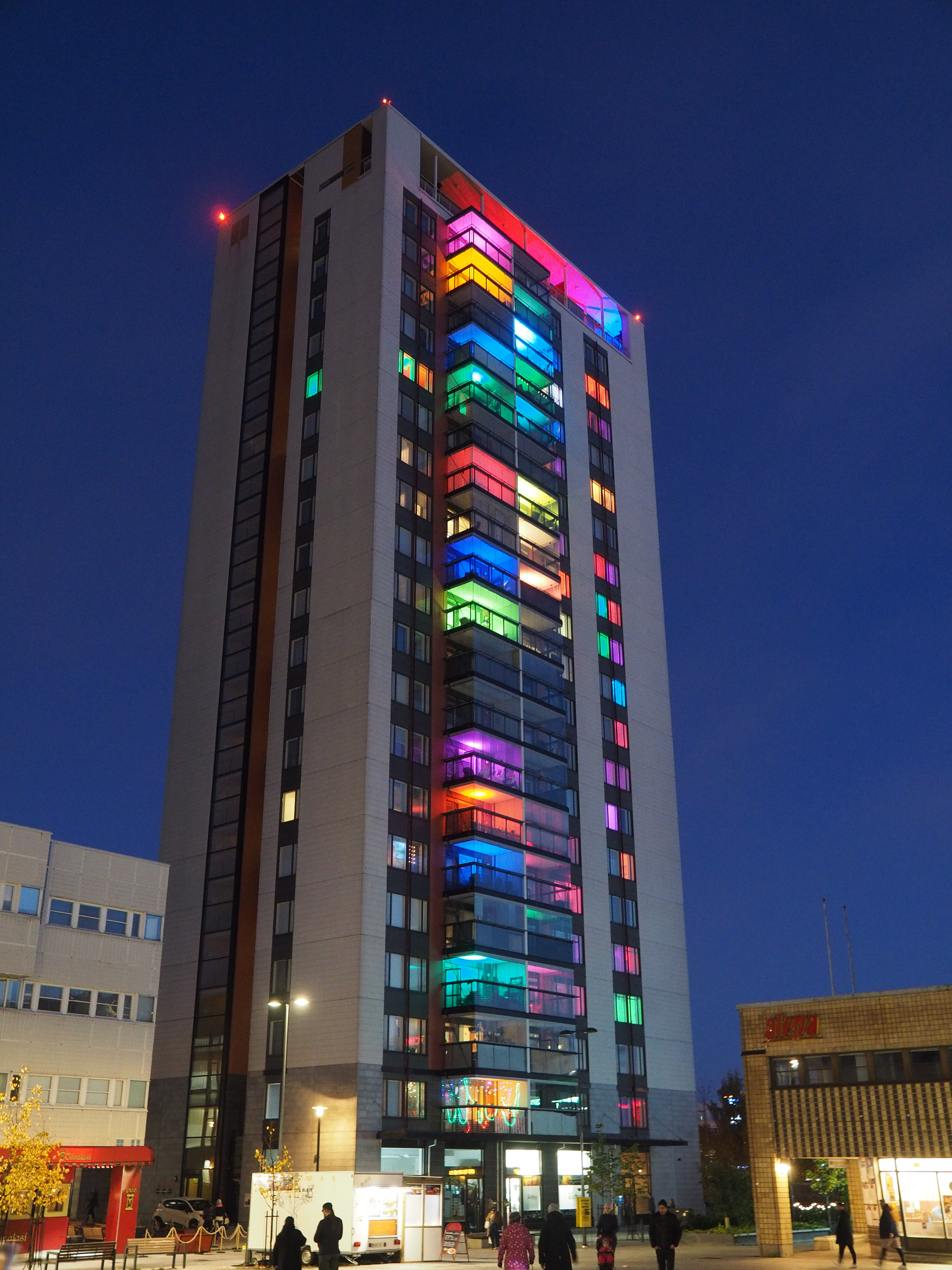
The Leppävaaran Torni building in Leppävaara, Espoo, Finland, illuminated with colorful lights in 2017

To define light source color properties, the lighting industry predominantly relies on two metrics, correlated color temperature (CCT), commonly used as an indication of the apparent "warmth" or "coolness" of the light emitted by a source, and color rendering index (CRI), an indication of the light source's ability to make objects appear natural. However, these two metrics, developed in the last century, are facing increased challenges and criticisms as new types of light sources, particularly light-emitting diodes (LEDs), become more prevalent in the market.

For example, in order to meet the expectations for good color rendering in retail applications, research suggests using the well-established CRI along with another metric called gamut area index (GAI). GAI represents the relative separation of object colors illuminated by a light source; the greater the GAI, the greater the apparent saturation or vividness of the object colors. As a result, light sources which balance both CRI and GAI are generally preferred over ones that have only high CRI or only high GAI.

=== Light exposure ===
Dosimeters measure an individual's or an object's exposure to something in the environment, such as light dosimeters and ultraviolet dosimeters.

In order to specifically measure the amount of light entering the eye, personal circadian light meter called the Daysimeter has been developed. This is the first device created to accurately measure and characterize light (intensity, spectrum, timing, and duration) entering the eye that affects the human body's clock.

The small, head-mounted device measures an individual's daily rest and activity patterns, as well as exposure to short-wavelength light that stimulates the circadian system. The device measures activity and light together at regular time intervals and electronically stores and logs its operating temperature. The Daysimeter can gather data for up to 30 days for analysis.

== Secondary effects ==
The primary function of lighting is typically to support vision. Lighting can additionally be used for positive health effects, but it can also have unintended negative health effects. Other secondary effects of lighting include energy use and environmental issues.

=== Health effects ===
It is valuable to provide the correct light intensity and color spectrum for each task or environment. Otherwise, energy not only could be wasted but over-illumination can lead to adverse health and psychological effects. Beyond the energy factors being considered, it is important not to over-design illumination, lest adverse health effects such as headache frequency, stress, and increased blood pressure be induced by the higher lighting levels. In addition, glare or excess light can decrease worker efficiency.

Analysis of lighting quality particularly emphasizes use of natural lighting, but also considers spectral content if artificial light is to be used. Not only will greater reliance on natural light reduce energy consumption, but will favorably impact human health and performance. New studies have shown that the performance of students is influenced by the time and duration of daylight in their regular schedules. Designing school facilities to incorporate the right types of light at the right time of day for the right duration may improve student performance and well-being. Similarly, designing lighting systems that maximize the right amount of light at the appropriate time of day for the elderly may help relieve symptoms of Alzheimer's disease. The human circadian system is entrained to a 24-hour light-dark pattern that mimics the earth's natural light/dark pattern. When those patterns are disrupted, they disrupt the natural circadian cycle. Circadian disruption may lead to numerous health problems including breast cancer, seasonal affective disorder, delayed sleep phase syndrome, and other ailments.

A study conducted in 1972 and 1981, documented by Robert Ulrich, surveyed 23 surgical patients assigned to rooms looking out on a natural scene. The study concluded that patients assigned to rooms with windows allowing much natural light had shorter postoperative hospital stays, received fewer negative evaluative comments in nurses' notes, and took fewer potent analgesics than 23 matched patients in similar rooms with windows facing a brick wall. This study suggests that due to the nature of the scenery and daylight exposure was indeed healthier for patients as opposed to those exposed to little light from the brick wall. In addition to increased work performance, proper usage of windows and daylighting crosses the boundaries between pure aesthetics and overall health.

Alison Jing Xu, assistant professor of management at the University of Toronto Scarborough and Aparna Labroo of Northwestern University conducted a series of studies analyzing the correlation between lighting and human emotion. The researchers asked participants to rate a number of things such as: the spiciness of chicken-wing sauce, the aggressiveness of a fictional character, how attractive someone was, their feelings about specific words, and the taste of two juices–all under different lighting conditions. In their study, they found that both positive and negative human emotions are felt more intensely in bright light. Professor Xu stated, "we found that on sunny days depression-prone people actually become more depressed." They also found that dim light makes people make more rational decisions and settle negotiations easier. In the dark, emotions are slightly suppressed. However, emotions are intensified in the bright light.

=== Energy consumption ===
Several strategies are available to minimize energy requirements for lighting a building:

- Specification of illumination requirements for each given use area
- Analysis of lighting quality to ensure that adverse components of lighting (for example, glare or incorrect color spectrum) are not biasing the design
- Integration of space planning and interior architecture (including choice of interior surfaces and room geometries) to lighting design
- Design of time of day use that does not expend unnecessary energy
- Selection of fixtures and lamps that reflect best available technology for energy conservation
- Training of building occupants to use lighting equipment in most efficient manner
- Maintenance of lighting systems to minimize energy wastage
- Use of natural light
  - Some big box stores were being built from 2006 on with numerous plastic bubble skylights, in many cases completely obviating the need for interior artificial lighting for many hours of the day.
  - In countries where indoor lighting of simple dwellings is a significant cost, "Moser lamps", plastic water-filled transparent drink bottles fitted through the roof, provide the equivalent of a 40- to 60-watt incandescent bulb each during daylight.
- Load shedding can help reduce the power requested by individuals to the main power supply. Load shedding can be done on an individual level, at a building level, or even at a regional level.

Specification of illumination requirements is the basic concept of deciding how much illumination is required for a given task. Clearly, much less light is required to illuminate a hallway compared to that needed for a word processing work station. Generally speaking, the energy expended is proportional to the design illumination level. For example, a lighting level of 400 lux might be chosen for a work environment involving meeting rooms and conferences, whereas a level of 80 lux could be selected for building hallways. If the hallway standard simply emulates the conference room needs, then much more energy will be consumed than is needed.

==== Lighting control systems ====
Lighting control systems reduce energy usage and cost by helping to provide light only when and where it is needed. Lighting control systems typically incorporate the use of time schedules, occupancy control, and photocell control (i.e. daylight harvesting). Some systems also support demand response and will automatically dim or turn off lights to take advantage of utility incentives. Lighting control systems are sometimes incorporated into larger building automation systems.

Many newer control systems are using wireless mesh open standards (such as Zigbee), which provides benefits including easier installation (no need to run control wires) and interoperability with other standards-based building control systems (e.g. security).

In response to daylighting technology, daylight harvesting systems have been developed to further reduce energy consumption. These technologies are helpful, but they do have their downfalls. Many times, rapid and frequent switching of the lights on and off can occur, particularly during unstable weather conditions or when daylight levels are changing around the switching illuminance. Not only does this disturb occupants, it can also reduce lamp life. A variation of this technology is the 'differential switching or dead-band' photoelectric control which has multiple illuminances it switches from so as not to disturb occupants as much.

Occupancy sensors to allow operation for whenever someone is within the area being scanned can control lighting. When motion can no longer be detected, the lights shut off. Passive infrared sensors react to changes in heat, such as the pattern created by a moving person. The control must have an unobstructed view of the building area being scanned. Doors, partitions, stairways, etc. will block motion detection and reduce its effectiveness. The best applications for passive infrared occupancy sensors are open spaces with a clear view of the area being scanned. Ultrasonic sensors transmit sound above the range of human hearing and monitor the time it takes for the sound waves to return. A break in the pattern caused by any motion in the area triggers the control. Ultrasonic sensors can see around obstructions and are best for areas with cabinets and shelving, restrooms, and open areas requiring 360-degree coverage. Some occupancy sensors utilize both passive infrared and ultrasonic technology, but are usually more expensive. They can be used to control one lamp, one fixture or many fixtures.

==== Daylighting ====
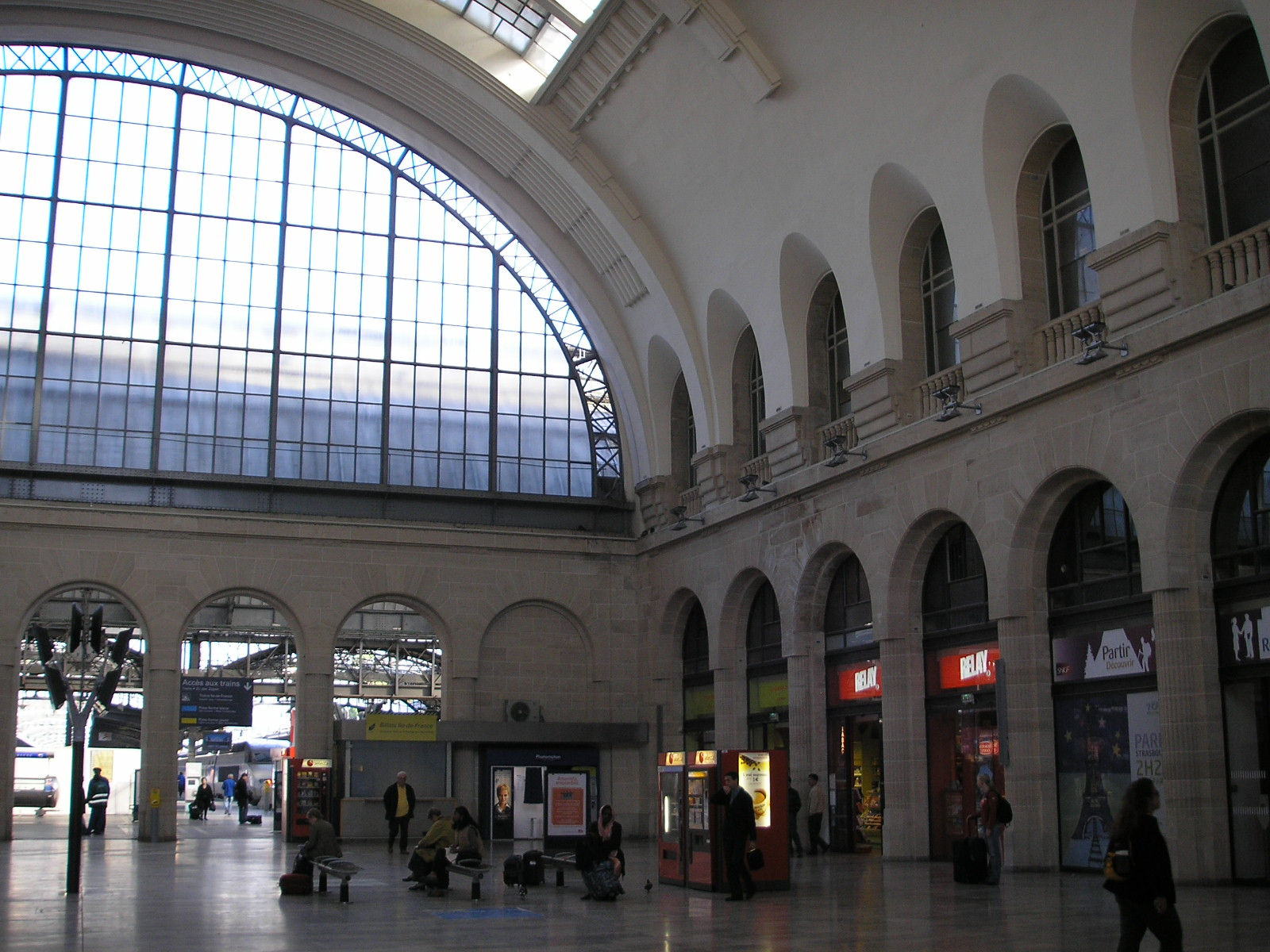
Daylight used at the train station Gare de l'Est Paris

Daylighting is the oldest method of interior lighting. Daylighting is simply designing a space to use as much natural light as possible. This decreases energy consumption and costs, and requires less heating and cooling from the building. Daylighting has also been proven to have positive effects on patients in hospitals as well as work and school performance. Due to a lack of information that indicate the likely energy savings, daylighting schemes are not yet popular among most buildings. Unlike electric lighting, the distribution of daylight varies considerably throughout the entire year inside a building.

==== Solid-state lighting ====
In recent years light-emitting diodes (LEDs) are becoming increasingly efficient leading to an extraordinary increase in the use of solid state lighting. In many situations, controlling the light emission of LEDs may be done most effectively by using the principles of nonimaging optics.

=== Environmental issues ===
==== Compact fluorescent lamps ====
Compact fluorescent lamps (CFLs) use less power than an incandescent lamp to supply the same amount of light, however they contain mercury which is a disposal hazard. Due to the ability to reduce electricity consumption, many organizations encouraged the adoption of CFLs. Some electric utilities and local governments subsidized CFLs or provided them free to customers as a means of reducing electricity demand. For a given light output, CFLs use between one fifth and one quarter the power of an equivalent incandescent lamp. Unlike incandescent lamps CFLs need a little time to warm up and reach full brightness. Not all CFLs are suitable for dimming. CFL's have largely been replaced with LED technologies.

==== LED lamps ====
LED lamps provide significant energy savings over incandescent and fluorescent lamps. According to the Energy Saving Trust, LED lamps use only 10% power compared to a standard incandescent bulb, where compact fluorescent lamps use 20% and energy saving halogen lamps 70%. The lifetime is also much longer — up to 50,000 hours. The downside when they were first popularized was the initial cost. By 2018, production costs dropped, performance increased, and energy consumption was reduced. While the initially cost of LEDs is still higher than incandescent lamps, the savings are so dramatic that there are very few instances that LEDs are not the most economical choice.

Scattered light from outdoor illumination may have effects on the environment and human health. For instance, one study conducted by the American Medical Association warned on the use of high blue content white LEDs in street lighting, due to their higher impact on human health and environment, compared to low blue content light sources (e.g. High Pressure Sodium, phosphor-coated or PC amber LEDs, and low CCT LEDs).

==== Light pollution ====
Light pollution is a growing problem in reaction to excess light being given off by numerous signs, houses, and buildings. Polluting light is often wasted light involving unnecessary energy costs and carbon dioxide emissions. Light pollution is described as artificial light that is excessive or intrudes where it is not wanted. Well-designed lighting sends light only where it is needed without scattering it elsewhere. Poorly designed lighting can also compromise safety. For example, glare creates safety issues around buildings by causing very sharp shadows, temporarily blinding passersby making them vulnerable to would-be assailants. The negative ecological effects of artificial light have been increasingly well documented. The World Health Organization in 2007 issued a report that noted the effects of bright light on flora and fauna, sea turtle hatchlings, frogs during mating season and the migratory patterns of birds. The American Medical Association in 2012 issued a warning that extended exposure to light at night increases the risk of some cancers. Two studies in Israel from 2008 have yielded some additional findings about a possible correlation between artificial light at night and certain cancers.

===== Effects on animals =====
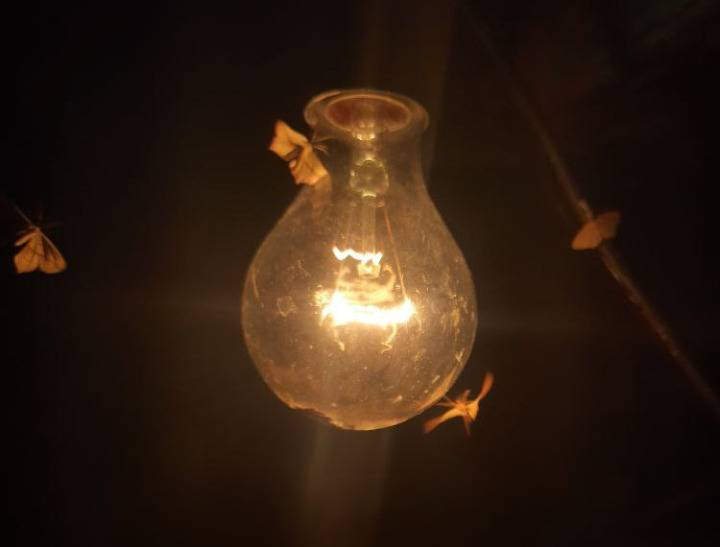
Moths circling an electric lightbulb

Artificial light at night refers to any light source other than a natural light source. Sources of artificial light include LEDS and fluorescents. This particular light source has effect on the reproduction, immune function, metabolism, thermoregulation and body temperature of organisms that need light for their daily activity.

Firstly, most organisms metabolism largely depends on light. In some instances the presence of intense light starts up or increases enzyme activity inside the body of an animal. For diurnal organisms, high rate of metabolism takes place during the day and reduces or comes to a stop during the night thus, artificial light at night has a negative impact of the metabolism of diurnal organisms. Moreover, the body temperature of diurnal animals fall during the night but the presence of artificial light at night, then causes an increase in body temperature which affects the melatonin levels of the animal.

Furthermore, for organisms such as birds, their sex organs are activated in relation to light intensity in certain periods during the summer at day time to aid reproduction. These sex organs are deactivated during the night but the presence of artificial light during the night sometimes disrupts their reproduction process.

== Professional organizations ==
=== International ===
The International Commission on Illumination (CIE) is an international authority and standard defining organization on color and lighting. Publishing widely used standard metrics such as various CIE color spaces and the color rendering index.

The Illuminating Engineering Society (IES), in conjunction with organizations like ANSI and ASHRAE, publishes guidelines, standards, and handbooks that allow categorization of the illumination needs of different built environments. Manufacturers of lighting equipment publish photometric data for their products, which defines the distribution of light released by a specific luminaire. This data is typically expressed in standardized form defined by the IESNA.

The International Association of Lighting Designers (IALD) is an organization which focuses on the advancement of lighting design education and the recognition of independent professional lighting designers. Those fully independent designers who meet the requirements for professional membership in the association typically append the abbreviation IALD to their name.

The National Council on Qualifications for the Lighting Professions (NCQLP) offers the Lighting Certification Examination which tests rudimentary lighting design principles. Individuals who pass this exam become "Lighting Certified" and may append the abbreviation LC to their name. This certification process is one of three national (U.S.) examinations (the others are CLEP and CLMC) in the lighting industry and is open not only to designers, but to lighting equipment manufacturers, electric utility employees, etc.

The Professional Lighting And Sound Association (PLASA) is a UK-based trade organisation representing the 500+ individual and corporate members drawn from the technical services sector. Its members include manufacturers and distributors of stage and entertainment lighting, sound, rigging and similar products and services, and affiliated professionals in the area. They lobby for and represent the interests of the industry at various levels, interacting with government and regulating bodies and presenting the case for the entertainment industry. Example subjects of this representation include the ongoing review of radio frequencies (which may or may not affect the radio bands in which wireless microphones and other devices use) and engaging with the issues surrounding the introduction of the RoHS (Restriction of Hazardous Substances Directive) regulations.

=== National ===
- Association de Concepteurs Eclairage (ACE) in France
- American Lighting Association (ALA) in the United States
- Associazione Professionisti dell'Illuminazione (APIL) in Italy
- Hellenic Illumination Committee (HIC) in Greece
- Indian Society of Lighting Engineers (ISLE)
- Institution of Lighting Engineers (ILE) in the United Kingdom
- Schweizerische Licht Gesellschaft (SLG) in Switzerland
- Society of Light and Lighting (SLL), part of the Chartered Institution of Building Services Engineers in the United Kingdom.
- United Scenic Artists Local 829 (USA829), membership for lighting designers as a category, with scenic designers, projection designers, costume designers, and sound designers, in the United States

== See also ==
- Anglepoise lamp, successful and innovative desk lamp design
- Automotive lighting
- Banning of incandescent light bulbs
- Bug zapper
- Candlepower
- Computer graphics lighting
- Fishing light attractor, underwater lights to attract fish
- Home automation
- Light fixture
- Light in school buildings
- Light pollution
- Lighting control systems, for a buildings or residences
- Lighting for the elderly
- Luminous efficacy
- Neon lighting (for signage)
- Over-illumination
- Seasonal affective disorder
- Sustainable lighting
- Three-point lighting, technique used in both still photography and in film

=== Inventors ===
- Joseph Swan, carbonized-thread filament incandescent lamp
- Alexander Nikolayevich Lodygin, carbon-rod filament incandescent lamp
- Thomas Edison, long-lasting incandescent lamp with high-resistance filament
- John Richardson Wigham, lighthouse engineer

=== Lists ===
- List of environmental health hazards
- List of light sources
- Timeline of lighting technology
