= Visual comfort probability =

Visual comfort probability (VCP), also known as Guth visual comfort probability, is a metric used to rate lighting scenes.

VCP is defined as the percentage of people that will find a certain scene (viewpoint and direction) comfortable with regard to visual glare. It was defined by Sylvester K. Guth in 1963.
