= Artificial sunlight =

Use of a light source to simulate sunlight

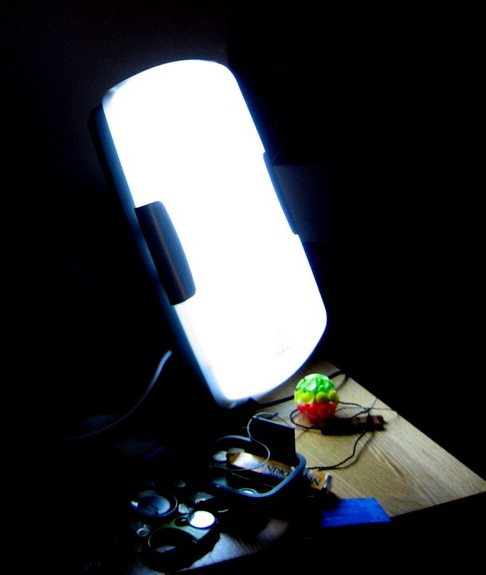
The HappyLite is a type of light therapy.

Artificial sunlight is the use of a light source to simulate sunlight where the unique characteristics of sunlight are needed, but where sufficient natural sunlight is unavailable or infeasible. A device used to simulate sunlight is a solar simulator.

== Composition of natural sunlight ==
Solar irradiance spectrum above atmosphere and at surface

The spectrum of electromagnetic radiation striking the Earth's atmosphere is 100 to 1,000,000 nanometers (nm). This can be divided into five regions in increasing order of wavelengths:

- Ultraviolet C (UVC) range: 100–290 nm
- Ultraviolet B (UVB) range: 290–320 nm
- Ultraviolet A (UVA) range: 320–400 nm
- Visible range or light: 400–700 nm
- Infrared range. It is further divided into three types on the basis of wavelength:
  - Infrared-A: 700–1,400 nm
  - Infrared-B: 1,400–3,000 nm
  - Infrared-C: 3,000–1,000,000 nm

== Applications ==
=== Illumination ===
It has been claimed that artificial light-sources whose spectra most closely mimic the spectrum of terrestrial sunlight are good for human health and productivity. Such sources give full-spectrum light.

=== Light therapy ===
Artificial sunlight is useful in treating and preventing seasonal affective disorder (also known as winter depression, which causes depression symptoms specifically in winter), and delayed sleep phase syndrome, in which the circadian rhythm (the rhythmic alternation between daylight and nighttime behavior and bodily states) is disturbed and the person falls asleep much later than he or she wants.

Artificial sunlight may also be useful in reducing the severity of jet lag.

=== Aquarium lighting ===
Different corals in a reef aquarium require different lighting conditions. Most corals depend symbiotically on zooxanthellae, a type of alga. The zooxanthellae require light to perform photosynthesis, and they provide the coral polyps with simple carbohydrates. A technique employing light-emitting diodes (LEDs) allows microprocessor control of the parameters of lighting, such as warmth and coolness of color, which facilitates the simulation of daybreak, sunset, and lunar phases. Some animals, such as the red-eared slider turtle, also benefit from such aquarium lights.

=== Product testing ===
Testing the efficacy of sunscreens requires the use of solar simulators.

Manufacturers of solar cells must test the overall efficiency of the cells. They require to be tested indoors, which has traditionally been performed using mostly Sulphur plasma lamps or xenon arc lamp.

Within the automotive industry, solar simulation tests are used to ensure automotive system reliability and functionality.

Artificial sunlight (solar simulators) are also used for sun light exposure testing and of color fastness and material stability for textile, plastics and paints.
