= Full-spectrum light =

Light with frequencies ranging from infrared to near-ultraviolet

Full-spectrum light is light that covers the electromagnetic spectrum from infrared to near-ultraviolet, or all wavelengths that are useful to plant or animal life; in particular, sunlight is considered full spectrum, even though the solar spectral distribution reaching Earth changes with time of day, latitude, and atmospheric conditions.

"Full-spectrum" is not a technical term when applied to an electrical light bulb. It is a marketing term to implies that the product emulates some important quality of natural light.

Products marketed as "full-spectrum" may produce light throughout the entire visible spectrum, but without producing a spectral distribution that matches any particular natural lights source. Some may not differ substantially from lights not marketed as "full-spectrum".

Color of daylight and a blackbody, compared

== Spectral distribution of light ==
The amount of visible energy per unit time available in each segment of the spectrum is known as the spectral power distribution. Natural light sources do not have perfectly even distribution of power as a function of wavelength.

Color temperature and Color Rendering Index (CRI) are the standards for measuring light. Color temperature is the temperature of a (theoretical) black body radiator that most closely matches the spectral distribution of a light source. If only a few wavelengths of light are present, color temperature cannot be defined. Color rendering index is one measure of how closely the human perception of color under a particular light source matches that perception under a specified reference light source, defined to have an index of 100.

Due to the characteristics of the human eye and color perception, a useful approximation to white light might be obtained with only three sources of pure red, pure blue, and pure green light. Such a light source could have a defined color temperature but would have a poor color rendering index. Its spectrum would be discontinuous as it would lack any energy at intermediate wavelengths.

There is no technical definition of "full-spectrum" so it cannot be measured. To compare "full-spectrum" sources requires direct comparison of spectral distribution.

Color emitted by a black body on a linear scale from 800 kelvins to 12200 kelvins

The emission spectrum of a light source varies depending on the light generating mechanism. Thermal sources such as incandescent bulbs produce electromagnetic radiation over a broad and continuous range of wavelengths, including infrared and ultraviolet. A black body radiator is the idealized version of a thermal source. As the temperature of a black body radiator increases, the shape of its spectral distribution changes with more energy emitted at shorter (bluer) wavelengths.

Sources that rely on fluorescence have a different emission spectrum shape than do thermal sources. Some wavelengths will be produced with greater amplitude than others. Fluorescent sources used for lighting, such as fluorescent lamps, white light-emitting diodes, and metal halide lamps are intended to produce light at all wavelengths, but the distribution is different from thermal sources and so colors will appear different under these forms of lighting than under daylight; some colors may match under one light source that don't appear the same under another, a phenomenon called metamerism.

Where light sources use an electric discharge through low pressure gas, the light spectrum may be quite discontinuous, with some wavelengths of light missing or at very low amplitude. Such light sources have a strong tint, such as low pressure sodium lamps, or neon lamps. These lamps are used more for their color effects than for general illumination. Some scientific instruments use discharge tubes to produce light that has only a few wavelengths in it, a so-called "line spectrum". A laser is a single-wavelength source, which would produce light of a very pure color.

Artificial light sources such as LED lamps are designed to minimize production of non-visible infrared and ultraviolet wavelength, since this energy is not visible and does not contribute to the Luminous efficacy of the light source. These wavelengths are present in natural daylight. Where they are important for some applications, they may ave to be especially added to the spectrum of a nominally white light source.

== Use in art and in color matching ==
Ideally, during the day, an art studio (in the northern hemisphere) should be lit with northern sunlight, because it is considered more neutral and diffused than the direct, "yellowish" quality of southern sunlight. Since many artists' studios lack north-facing windows, full-spectrum lamps are sometimes used to approximate such light. Full-spectrum fluorescent lamps are also used by color scientists, color matchers in paint stores and quilters and others working with fabrics or yarn when working under inadequate lighting conditions to assist in achieving the correct hues as they will later appear in daylight or under gallery lighting.

== Use in aquariums ==
Full spectrum lighting is used both for tropical and marine fish as well as many other aquatic pets. The use of full spectrum lighting assists aquarium plants to grow and aids in the health of the fish and the tank as a whole. While plants have adapted to the reception of real sunlight, full spectrum light bulbs often mimic the emphasis of wavelengths of sunlight enough that plants are stimulated to grow. Full spectrum lighting also enhances the natural coloration of fish, plants and other aquatic elements in an aquarium, which are often discolored by artificial lights. Full spectrum lighting is typically used more in fresh-water aquariums since marine or coral-reef aquariums often require intensely blue light.

== Use in gardening ==
Gardening under lights keeps plants blooming almost year-round, for a wintertime harvest. Grow lights are specifically intended to support plant growth, although with varying degrees of success and energy efficiency. Some plants grow better when given more of a certain color light, due to the mechanism of photosynthesis. Specifically more blue wavelengths enhance vegetative growth and development, while the addition of increasing amounts of red light enhances budding, flowering and fruiting.

== Use in sports turf management ==
Growing Turf in Stadiums in shade under lights keeps turfgrass growing in the middle of winter or in shade. Turf Grow lights are specifically designed to promote turf growth and in particular root growth. This ensures a stable and safe surface for players. However, some grow lights are more effective than others and recently there has been a move to more energy efficient LED systems.

As with all grow lights the light spectrum achieves different things. The red end of the spectrum tends to encourage vegetative growth whilst the blue tends to promote root growth.

== Use in seasonal affective disorder ==
In recent years, full-spectrum lighting has been used in the treatment of seasonal affective disorder (SAD) through the use of "light boxes" that mimic natural sunlight, which may not be available in some areas during the winter months. Light is an environmental stimulus for regulating circadian cycles.

Lightbox therapy, otherwise known as phototherapy, is a recognized modality for depression (such as SAD). It is also the primary treatment for circadian rhythm sleep disorders. Depending on the quality of the light, it is estimated that 10,000 lux is needed for effective treatment. Not all light boxes are the same, and some produce only blue or green light.

A reduction in exposure to sunlight during winter months and the shift in times or sunrise and sunset can affect a person's Circadian rhythm/internal clock, serotonin levels and melatonin levels. Symptoms of SAD may be more pronounced in women (75% of SAD cases), in younger adults (18-30), those with depression or a family history of depression, and it is also more common in those who live more than 30 degrees north or south of the equator.

=== Independent verification ===
The non-profit Lighting Research Center, a group of utility companies, experts and government agencies, established the National Lighting Product Information Program (NLPIP) in the USA to provide objective information about the effectiveness of different lighting systems. According to the NLPIP, full-spectrum light does not provide any improved benefits over similar light systems.

A Cornell University study reached mixed conclusions on the use of full-spectrum lighting in restaurants to promote sales.

The National Research Council of Canada Institute for Research in Construction, a Canadian government research and development agency, has published several scientific articles about full-spectrum lighting, collected on their web page. The authors of these papers also have concluded that full-spectrum lighting (~5000 K, CRI>90) does not confer any benefits on performance, mood, or health compared to typical cool-white fluorescent lighting.

== See also ==
- Artificial sunlight
- Light ergonomics
- Sunlight
- Total spectrum solar concentrator
