= List of things named after Johann Lambert =

This article is a list of things named in the memory of the 18th century Swiss scientist Johann Heinrich Lambert:

== Optics ==
- Beer–Lambert law
  - Beer–Lambert–Bouguer law, see above
- lambert (unit)
  - Foot-lambert
- Lambert's cosine law
- Lambertian reflectance

== Mathematics ==
- Lambert azimuthal equal-area projection
- Lambert conformal conic projection
- Lambert cylindrical equal-area projection
- Lambert mean
- Lambert quadrilateral
- Lambert series
- Lambert summation
- Lambert W function
- Lambert's problem
- Lambert's theorem on the parabola
- Lambert's trinomial equation
- Lambertian function (inverse of the Gudermannian function)

== Other ==
- 187 Lamberta, asteroid
- Lambert (lunar crater). In the MARE IMBRIUM, Diameter: 30.1209 km
- Lambert (Martian crater). In the Sinus Sabaeus quadrangle of Mars, located at 20.2°S latitude and 334.7°W longitude. It is 92.0 km in diameter
