= Johann Heinrich Lambert =

Swiss polymath (1728–1777)

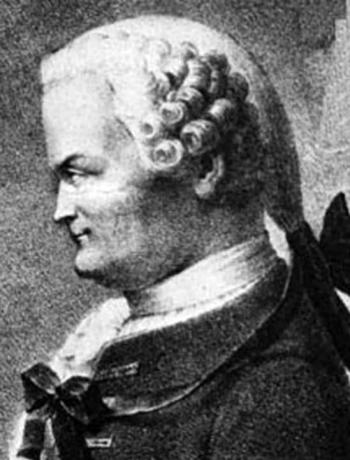
- Born: 26 or 28 August 1728; Mulhouse, Republic of Mulhouse
- Died: 25 September 1777 (aged 49); Berlin, Kingdom of Prussia
- Known for: First proof that π is irrational Beer–Lambert law Lambert's cosine law Transverse Mercator projection Lambert W function
- Scientific career
- Fields: Mathematics, physics, astronomy, philosophy

Johann Heinrich Lambert (German: [ˈlambɛʁt]; French: Jean-Henri Lambert; 26 or 28 August 1728 – 25 September 1777) was an Alsatian polymath from the Republic of Mulhouse—then an associate of the Swiss Confederacy—who made fundamental contributions to mathematics, physics (particularly optics), philosophy, astronomy, and map projections.

== Biography ==
Lambert was born in 1728 into a Huguenot family in the city-state of Mulhouse (in modern-day Alsace, France), which was allied to the Swiss Confederacy. His family had fled from Lorraine following the Thirty Years War. Historical sources differ on his exact date of birth, citing either 26 or 28 August.

Forced to leave school at age twelve due to financial constraints, Lambert pursued an exhaustive course of self-study during his free time while maintaining various jobs. In his youth, he worked as an assistant to his father (a tailor), a clerk at a local ironworks, a private tutor, and a secretary to the editor of the Basler Zeitung. At age twenty, he secured a position as private tutor to the sons of Count Salis in Chur, Switzerland.

Between 1756 and 1758, Lambert traveled extensively across Europe with his pupils, affording him the opportunity to connect with established mathematicians and intellectuals throughout the German states, the Netherlands, France, and the Italian states. Upon returning to Chur, he published his first major treatises on optics and cosmology and began seeking a formal academic appointment.

Following several short-term positions, Lambert's growing reputation earned him an invitation in 1763 to join the Prussian Academy of Sciences in Berlin. Supported by Frederick II of Prussia and working alongside Leonhard Euler, he spent his remaining years in this intellectually stimulating and financially secure environment, producing a prolific volume of work until his death in 1777.

== Work ==
=== Mathematics ===
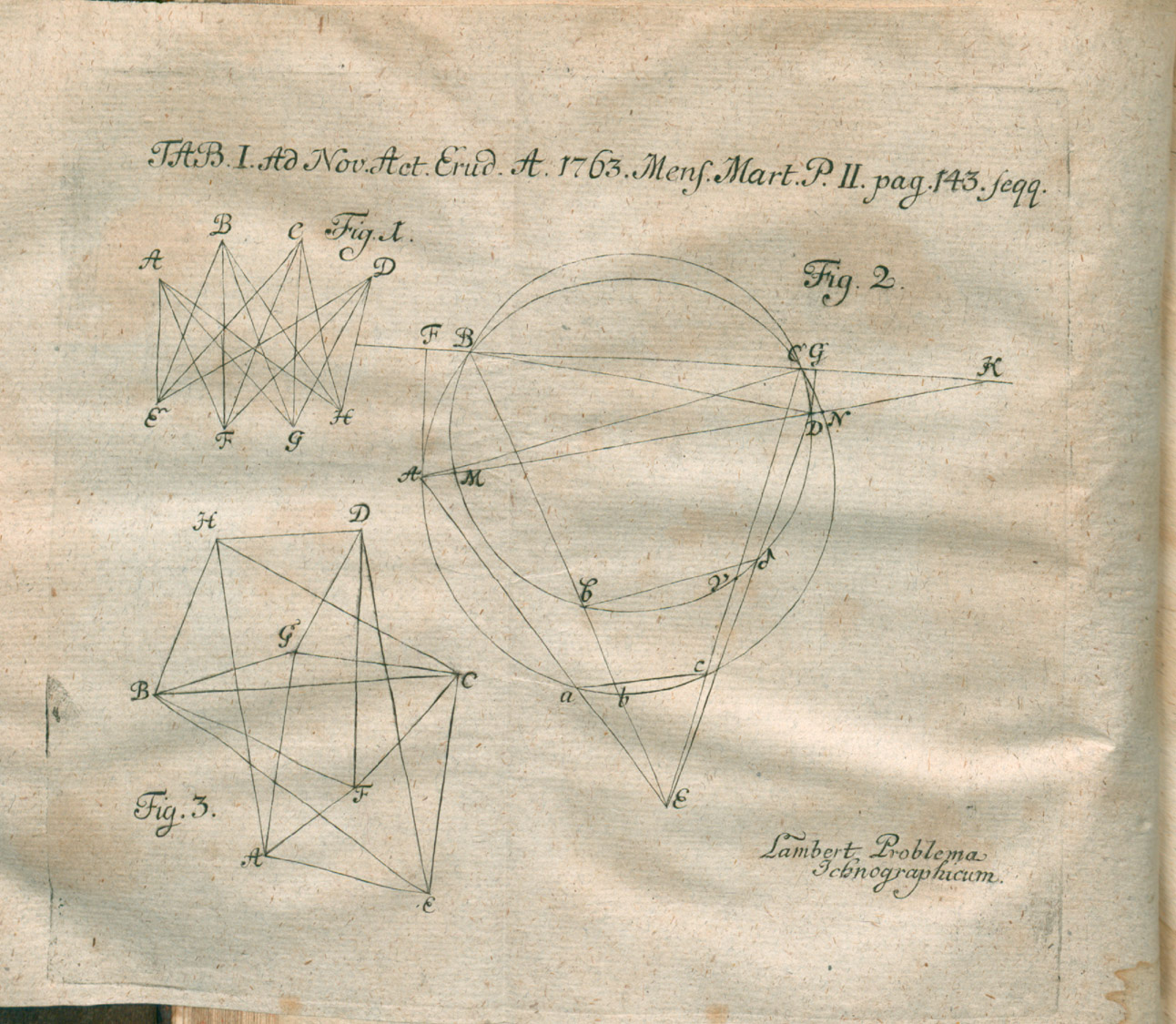
Illustration from De ichnographica campi published in Acta Eruditorum, 1763

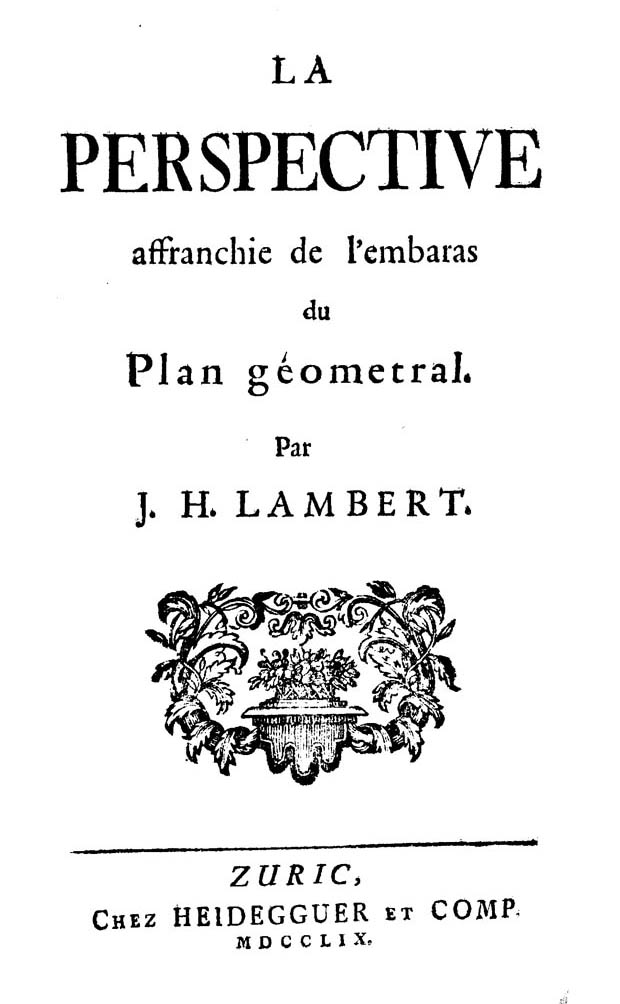
La perspective affranchie de l'embarras du plan géometral, French edition, 1759

Lambert was the first to systematize and popularize the use of hyperbolic functions into trigonometry. He credits the previous works of Vincenzo Riccati and Daviet de Foncenex. Lambert developed exponential expressions and identities and introduced the modern notation. Lambert also made conjectures about non-Euclidean space.

Lambert is credited with the first proof that π is irrational using a generalized continued fraction for the function tan x. Euler believed the conjecture but could not prove that π was irrational, and it is speculated that Aryabhata also believed this, in 500 CE. Lambert also devised theorems about conic sections that made the calculation of the orbits of comets simpler.

Lambert devised a formula for the relationship between the angles and the area of hyperbolic triangles. These are triangles drawn on a concave surface, as on a saddle, instead of the usual flat Euclidean surface. Lambert showed that the angles added up to less than π (radians), or 180°. The defect (amount of shortfall) increases with area. The larger the triangle's area, the smaller the sum of the angles and hence the larger the defect C△ = π — (α + β + γ). That is, the area of a hyperbolic triangle (multiplied by a constant C) is equal to π (radians), or 180°, minus the sum of the angles α, β, and γ. Here C denotes, in the present sense, the negative of the curvature of the surface (taking the negative is necessary as the curvature of a saddle surface is by definition negative). As the triangle gets larger or smaller, the angles change in a way that forbids the existence of similar hyperbolic triangles, as only triangles that have the same angles will have the same area. Hence, instead of the area of the triangle's being expressed in terms of the lengths of its sides, as in Euclidean geometry, the area of Lambert's hyperbolic triangle can be expressed in terms of its angles.

=== Map projection ===
Lambert was the first mathematician to address the general properties of map projections (of a spherical Earth). In particular he was the first to discuss the properties of conformality and equal area preservation and to point out that they were mutually exclusive. (Snyder 1993 p77). In 1772, Lambert published seven new map projections under the title Anmerkungen und Zusätze zur Entwerfung der Land- und Himmelscharten, (translated as Notes and Comments on the Composition of Terrestrial and Celestial Maps by Waldo Tobler (1972)). Lambert did not give names to any of his projections but they are now known as:

1. Lambert conformal conic
2. Transverse Mercator
3. Lambert azimuthal equal area
4. Lagrange projection
5. Lambert cylindrical equal area
6. Transverse cylindrical equal area
7. Lambert conical equal area

The first three of these are of great importance. Further details may be found at map projections and in several texts.

=== Physics ===
Lambert invented the first practical hygrometer. In 1760, he published a book on photometry, the Photometria. From the assumption that light travels in straight lines, he showed that illumination was proportional to the strength of the source, inversely proportional to the square of the distance of the illuminated surface and the sine of the angle of inclination of the light's direction to that of the surface. These results were supported by experiments involving the visual comparison of illuminations and used for the calculation of illumination. In Photometria Lambert also cited a law of light absorption, formulated earlier by Pierre Bouguer he is mistakenly credited for (the Beer–Lambert law) and introduced the term albedo. Lambertian reflectance is named after him. He wrote a classic work on perspective and contributed to geometrical optics.

The non-SI unit of luminance, lambert, is named in recognition of his work in establishing the study of photometry. Lambert was also a pioneer in the development of three-dimensional colour models. Late in life, he published a description of a triangular colour pyramid (Farbenpyramide), which shows a total of 107 colours on six different levels, variously combining red, yellow and blue pigments, and with an increasing amount of white to provide the vertical component. His investigations were built on the earlier theoretical proposals of Tobias Mayer, greatly extending these early ideas. Lambert was assisted in this project by the court painter Benjamin Calau.

=== Logic and philosophy ===
In Lambert's main philosophical work, Neues Organon (New Organon, 1764, named after Aristotle's Organon), Lambert studied the rules for distinguishing subjective from objective appearances, connecting with his work in optics. The Neues Organon contains one of the first appearances of the term phenomenology, and it includes a presentation of the various kinds of syllogism. Lambert was influenced by the logical work of Gottfried Ploucquet. According to John Stuart Mill,

The German philosopher Lambert, whose Neues Organon (published in the year 1764) contains among other things one of the most elaborate and complete expositions of the syllogistic doctrine, has expressly examined which sort of arguments fall most suitably and naturally into each of the four figures; and his investigation is characterized by great ingenuity and clearness of thought.

A modern edition of the Neues Organon was published in 1990 by the Akademie-Verlag of Berlin.

In 1765 Lambert began corresponding with Immanuel Kant. Kant intended to dedicate the Critique of Pure Reason to Lambert, but the work was delayed, appearing after Lambert's death.

=== Astronomy ===
Lambert also developed a theory of the generation of the universe that was similar to the nebular hypothesis that Thomas Wright and Immanuel Kant had (independently) developed. Wright published his account in An Original Theory or New Hypothesis of the Universe (1750), Kant in Allgemeine Naturgeschichte und Theorie des Himmels, published anonymously in 1755. Shortly afterward, Lambert published his own version of the nebular hypothesis of the origin of the Solar System in Cosmologische Briefe über die Einrichtung des Weltbaues (1761). Lambert hypothesized that the stars near the Sun were part of a group which travelled together through the Milky Way, and that there were many such groupings (star systems) throughout the galaxy. The former was later confirmed by Sir William Herschel. In astrodynamics he also solved the problem of determination of time of flight along a section of orbit, known now as Lambert's problem. His work in this area is commemorated by the Asteroid 187 Lamberta named in his honour.

=== Meteorology ===
Lambert propounded the ideology of observing periodic phenomena first, try to derive their rules and then gradually expand the theory. He expressed his purpose in meteorology as follows:

It seems to me that if one wants to make meteorology more scientific than it currently is, one should imitate the astronomers who began with establishing general laws and middle movements without bothering too much with details first. [...] Should one not do the same in meteorology? It is a sure fact that meteorology has general laws and that it contains a great number of periodic phenomena. But we can but scarcely guess these latter. Only few observations have been made so far, and between these one cannot find connections.

— Johann Heinrich Lambert

To obtain more and better data of meteorology, Lambert proposed to establish a network of weather stations around the world, in which the various weather configurations (rain, clouds, dry ...) would be recorded – the methods that are still used nowadays. He also devoted himself to the improvement of the measuring instruments and accurate concepts for the advancement of meteorology. This results in his published works in 1769 and 1771 on hygrometry and hygrometers.

== Published works ==
- Lambert, Johann Heinrich. "Pyrometrie; oder, Vom maasse des feuers und der wȧrme. Mit acht kupfertafeln." Berlin, Bey Haude und Spener, 1779.
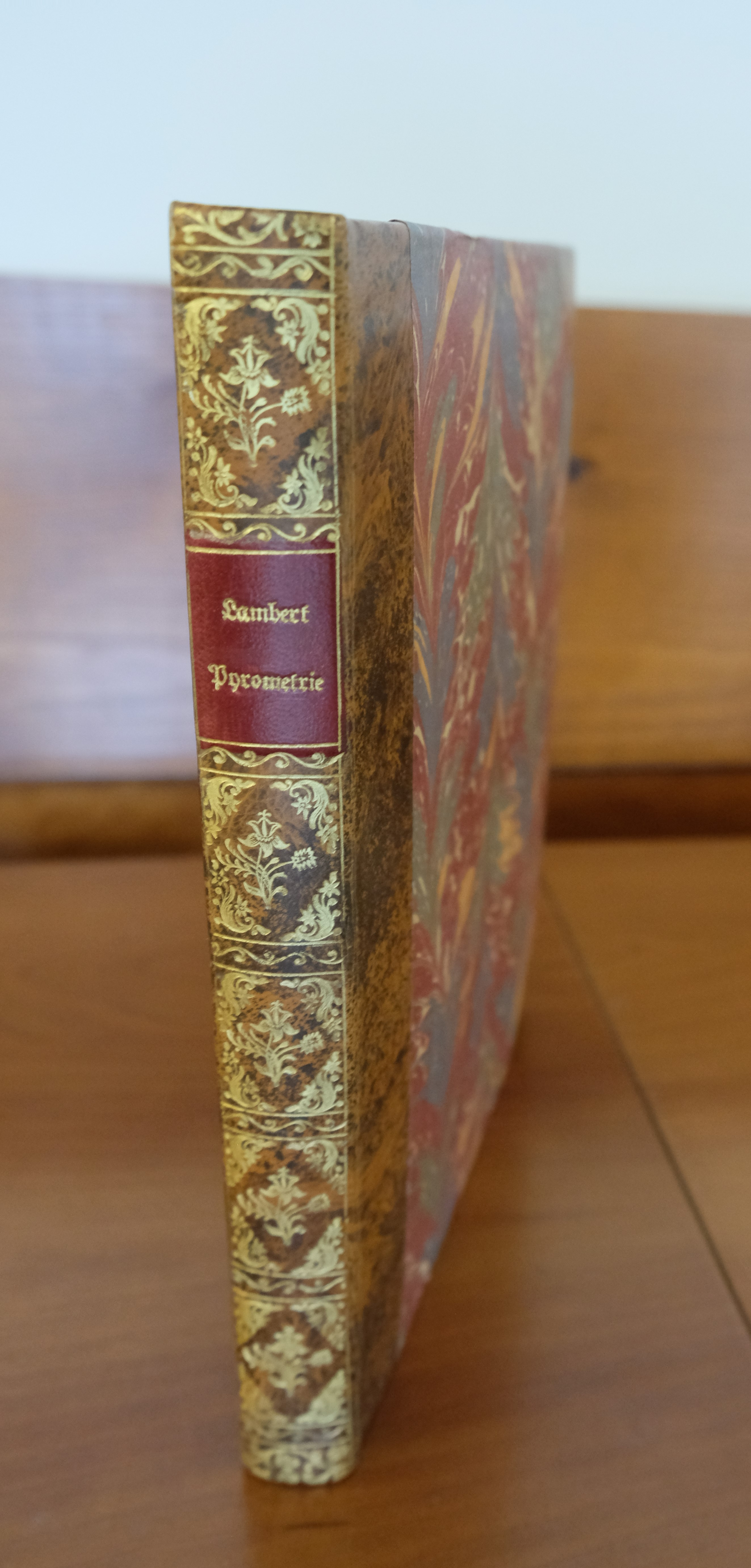
1779 copy of "Pyrometrie oder vom Maasse des Feuers und der Wärme"

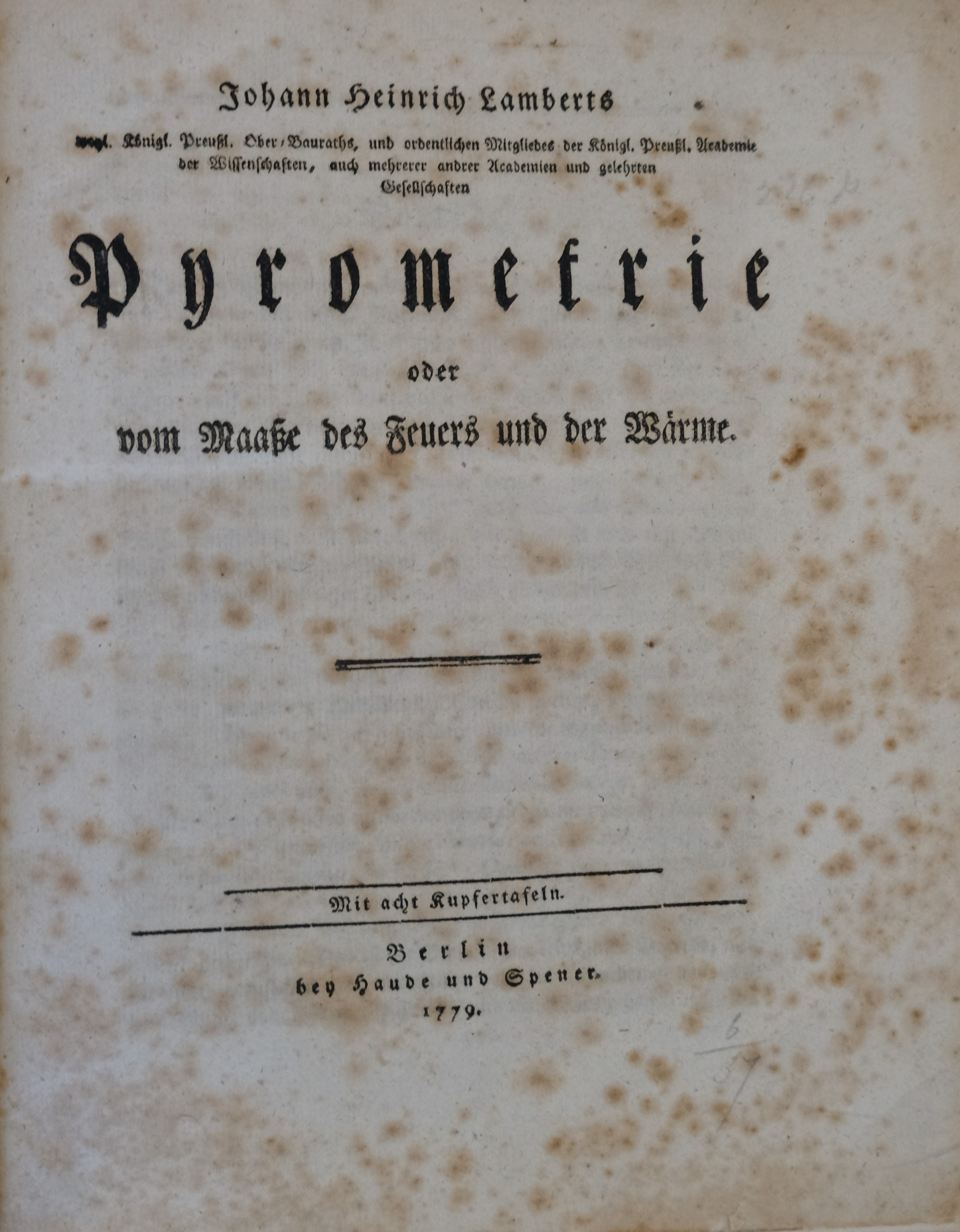
Title page to "Pyrometrie oder vom Maasse des Feuers und der Wärme"

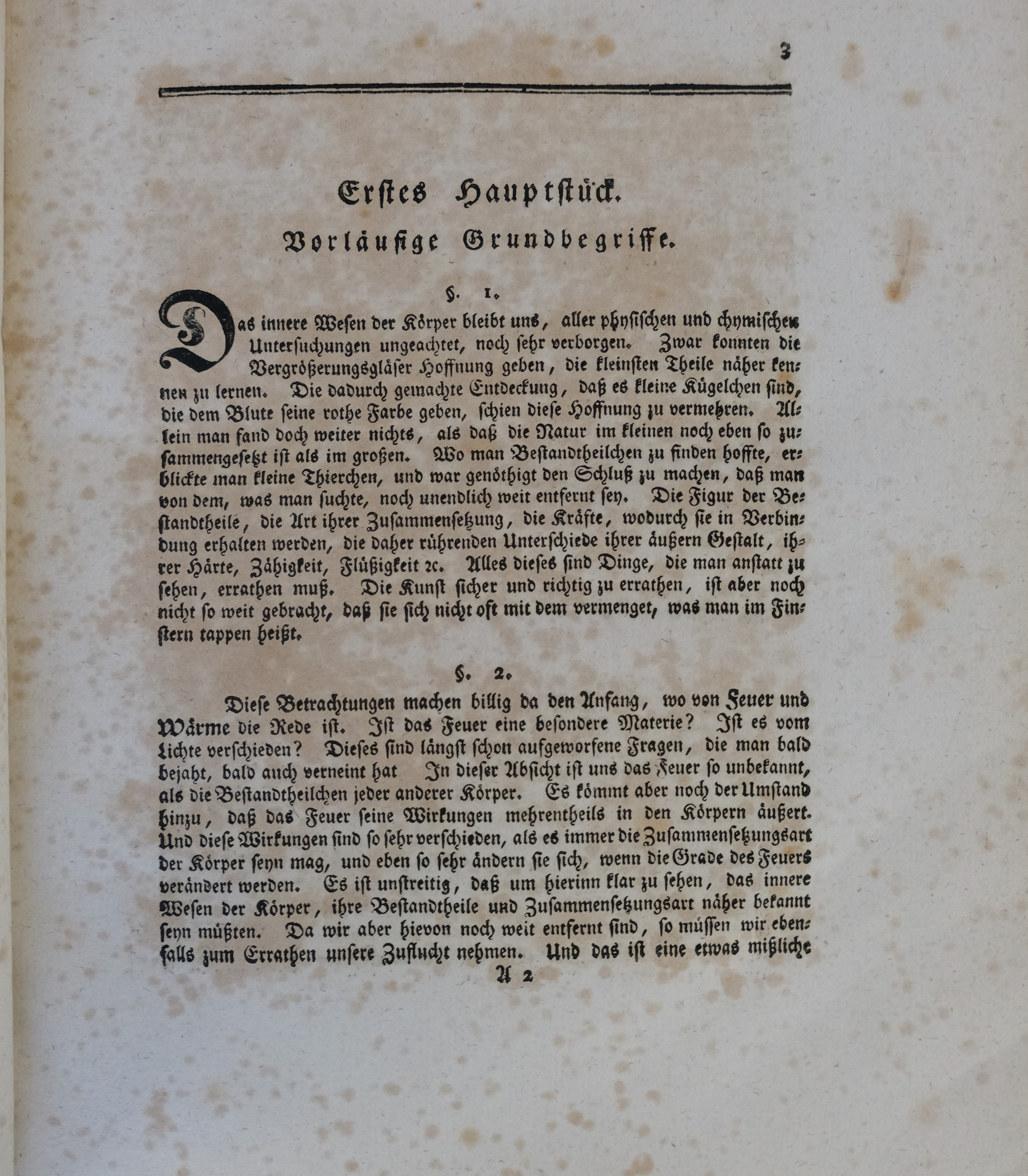
First page of "Pyrometrie oder vom Maasse des Feuers und der Wärme"

== See also ==
- List of things named after Johann Lambert
- Asteroid 187 Lamberta
- Lambert (Martian crater)
