= Spectralon =

Fluoropolymer which has the highest diffuse reflectance of any known material

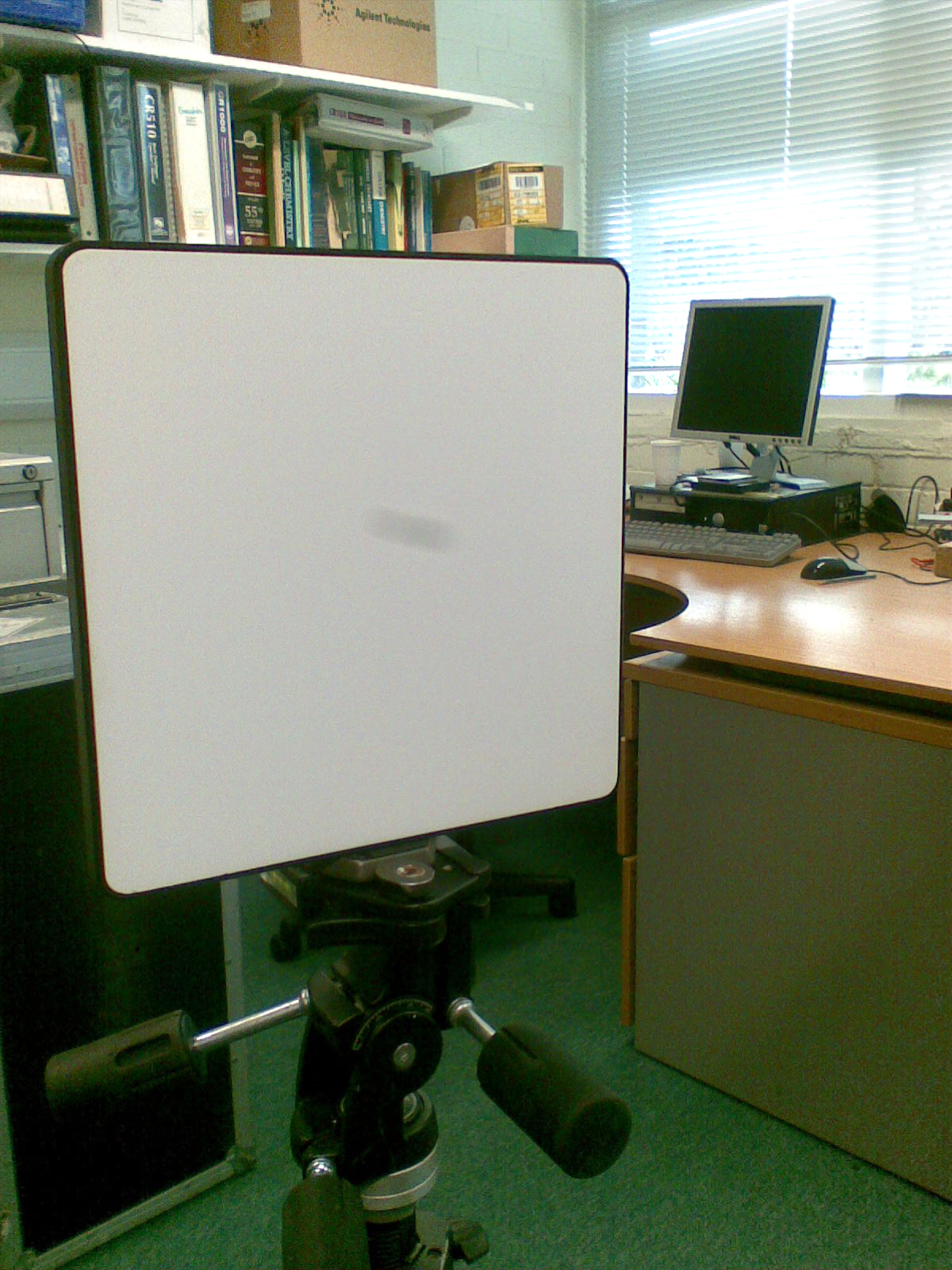
A Spectralon panel

Spectralon is a fluoropolymer that has the highest diffuse reflectance of any known material or coating over the ultraviolet, visible, and near-infrared regions of the spectrum. It is the whitest substance available and reflects 99% of the light. It exhibits highly Lambertian behavior, and can be machined into a wide variety of shapes for the construction of optical components such as calibration targets, integrating spheres, and optical pump cavities for lasers.

== Characteristics ==
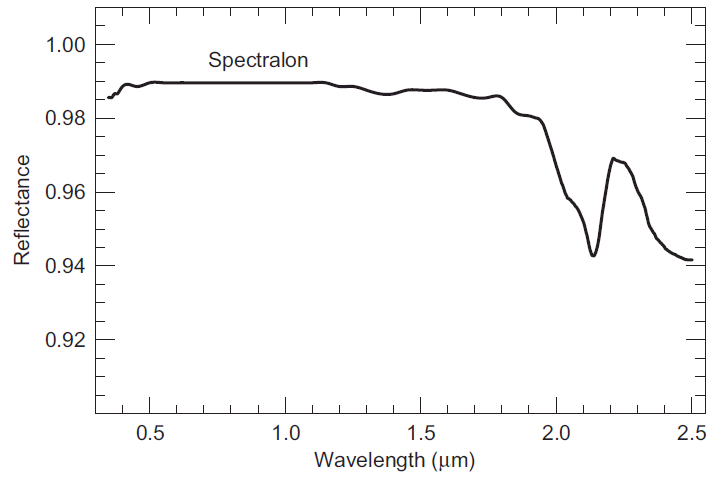
Reflectance spectrum of Spectralon

Spectralon's reflectance generally exceeds 99 percent over a range from 400 to 1500 nm and 95 percent from 250 to 2500 nm; however, grades are available with added carbon to achieve various gray levels. The material consists of PTFE powder that has been compressed into solid forms and sintered for stability, with approximately 40 percent void volume to enhance scattering of light. Surface or subsurface contamination may lower the reflectance at the extreme upper and lower ends of the spectral range. The material is also highly Lambertian at wavelengths from 257 nm to 10,600 nm, although reflectivity decreases at wavelengths beyond the near infrared. Spectralon exhibits absorbances at 2800 nm, then absorbs strongly (less than 20 percent reflectance) from 5400 to 8000 nm. Although the high diffuse reflectance allows efficient laser pumping, the material has a fairly low damage threshold of four joules per square centimeter, limiting its use to lower-powered systems.

Its Lambertian reflectance arises from the material's surface and immediate subsurface structure. The porous network of thermoplastic produces multiple reflections in the first few tenths of a millimeter. Spectralon can partially depolarize the light it reflects, but this effect decreases at high incidence angles. Although it is extremely hydrophobic, this open structure readily absorbs nonpolar solvents, greases and oils. Impurities are difficult to remove from Spectralon; thus, the material should be kept free from contaminants to maintain its reflectance properties.

The material has a hardness roughly equal to that of high-density polyethylene and is thermally stable to over 350 °C. It is chemically inert to all but the most powerful bases, such as sodium amide and organosodium or lithium compounds. Gross contamination of the material or marring of the optical surface can be remedied by sanding under a stream of running water. This surface refinishing both restores the original topography of the surface and returns the material to its original reflectance. Weathering tests on the material show no damage upon exposure to atmospheric ultraviolet flux. The material shows no sign of optical or physical degradation after long-term immersion testing in sea water.

== Applications ==
Three grades of Spectralon reflectance material are available: optical grade, laser grade, and space grade. Optical-grade Spectralon has a high reflectance and Lambertian behavior and is used primarily as a reference standard or target for calibration of spectrophotometers. Laser-grade Spectralon offers the same physical characteristics as optical-grade material but is a different formulation of resin that gives enhanced performance when used in laser pump cavities. Spectralon is used in a variety of "side-pumped" lasers. Space-grade Spectralon combines high reflectance with an extremely Lambertian reflectance profile and is used for terrestrial remote sensing applications.

Spectralon's optical properties make it ideal as a reference surface in remote sensing and spectroscopy. For instance, it is used to obtain leaf reflectance and bidirectional reflectance distribution functions in the laboratory. It can be applied to obtain vegetation fluorescence using Fraunhofer lines. Spectralon allows removal of contributions in the emitted light that are directly linked not to the surface (leaf) properties but to geometrical factors.

== History ==
Spectralon was developed by Labsphere and has been available since 1986.
