= Photometria =

Book by Johann Heinrich Lambert

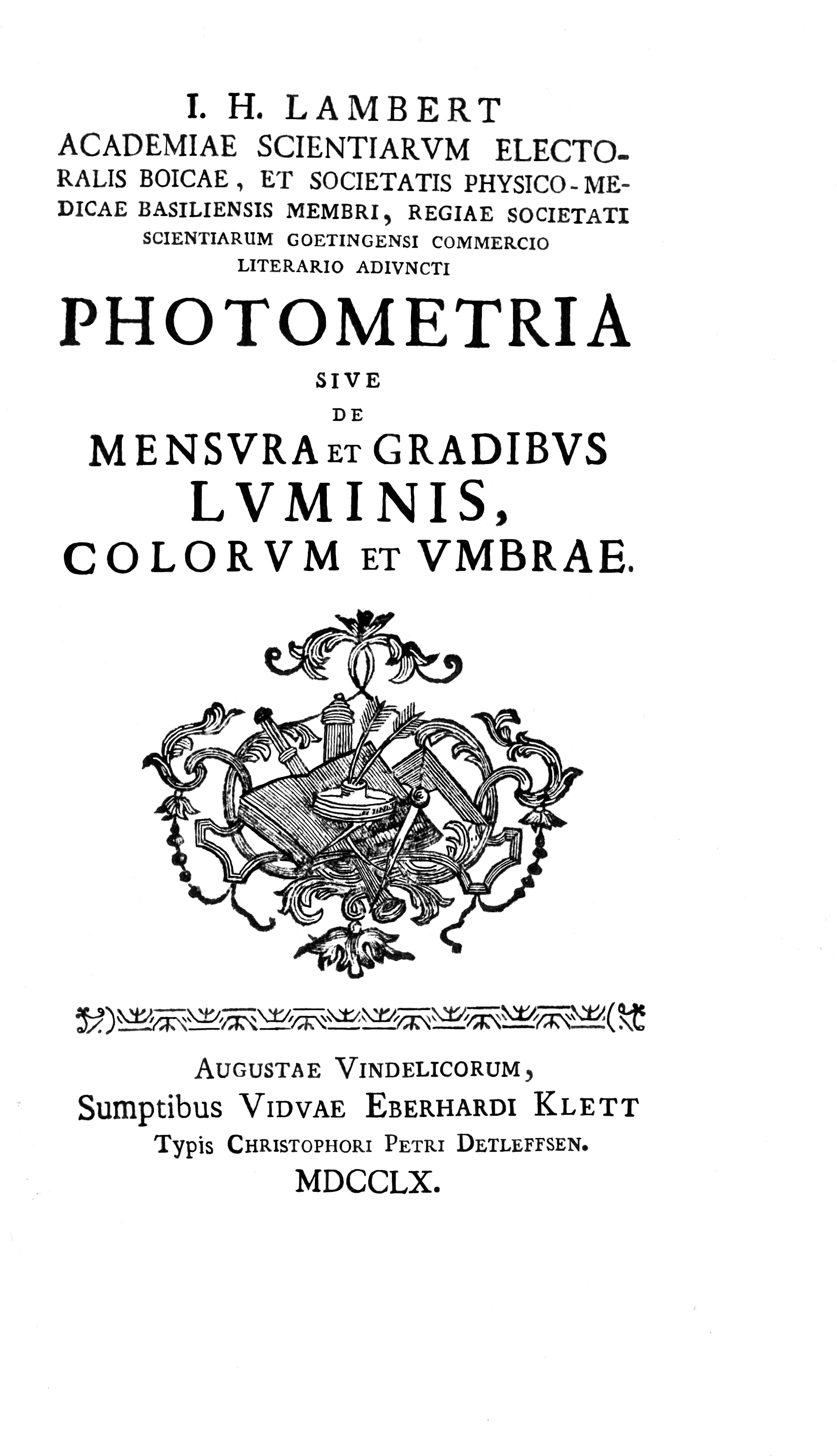
- Cover
- Author: Johann Heinrich Lambert
- Original title: Photometrie, sive de mensura et gradibus luminis, colorum et umbrae
- Language: Latin
- Publisher: Eberhardi Klett
- Publication date: 1760
- Publication place: Augsburg

Photometrie, sive de mensura et gradibus luminis, colorum et umbrae, better known as Photometria, is a book on the measurement of light by Johann Heinrich Lambert published in 1760. It established a complete system of photometric quantities and principles; using them to measure the optical properties of materials, quantify aspects of vision, and calculate illumination.

== Content ==
Written in Latin, the title of the book is a word Lambert devised from Ancient Greek: φῶς, φωτος (transliterated phôs, photos) = light, and μετρια (transliterated metria) = measure. Lambert’s word has found its way into European languages as photometry, photometrie, and fotometria. Photometria was the first work to accurately identify most fundamental photometric concepts, assemble them into a coherent system of photometric quantities, define these quantities with a precision sufficient for mathematical statements, and build from them a system of photometric principles. These concepts, quantities, and principles are still in use today.

Lambert began with two simple axioms: light travels in a straight line in a uniform medium and rays that cross do not interact. Like Johannes Kepler before him, he recognized that "laws" of photometry are simply consequences and follow directly from these two assumptions. In this way Photometria demonstrated (rather than assumed) that

1. Illuminance varies inversely as the square of the distance from a point source of light,
2. Illuminance on a surface varies as the cosine of the incidence angle measured from the surface perpendicular, and
3. Light decays exponentially in an absorbing medium.

In addition, Lambert postulated a surface that emits light (either as a source or by reflection) in a way such that the density of emitted light (luminous intensity) varies as the cosine of the angle measured from the surface perpendicular. In the case of a reflecting surface, this form of emission is assumed to be the case, regardless of the light's incident direction. Such surfaces are now referred to as "Perfectly Diffuse" or "Lambertian". See: Lambertian reflectance, Lambertian emitter.

Lambert demonstrated these principles in the only way available at the time: by contriving often ingenious optical arrangements that could make two immediately adjacent luminous fields appear equally bright (something that could only be determined by visual observation) when two physical quantities that produced the two fields were unequal by some specific amount (things that could be directly measured, such as angle or distance). In this way, Lambert quantified purely visual properties (such as luminous power, illumination, transparency, reflectivity) by relating them to physical parameters (such as distance, angle, radiant power, and color). Today, this is known as "visual photometry." Lambert was among the first to accompany experimental measurements with estimates of uncertainties based on a theory of errors and what he experimentally determined as the limits of visual assessment.

Although previous workers had pronounced photometric laws 1 and 3, Lambert established the second and added the concept of perfectly diffuse surfaces. But more importantly, as Ernst Anding pointed out in his German translation of Photometria, "Lambert had incomparably clearer ideas about photometry" and with them established a complete system of photometric quantities. Based on the three laws of photometry and the supposition of perfectly diffuse surfaces, Photometria developed and demonstrated the following:

1. Just noticeable differences

In the first section of Photometria, Lambert established and demonstrated the laws of photometry. He did this with visual photometry and to establish the uncertainties involved, described its approximate limits by determining how small a brightness difference the visual system could determine.

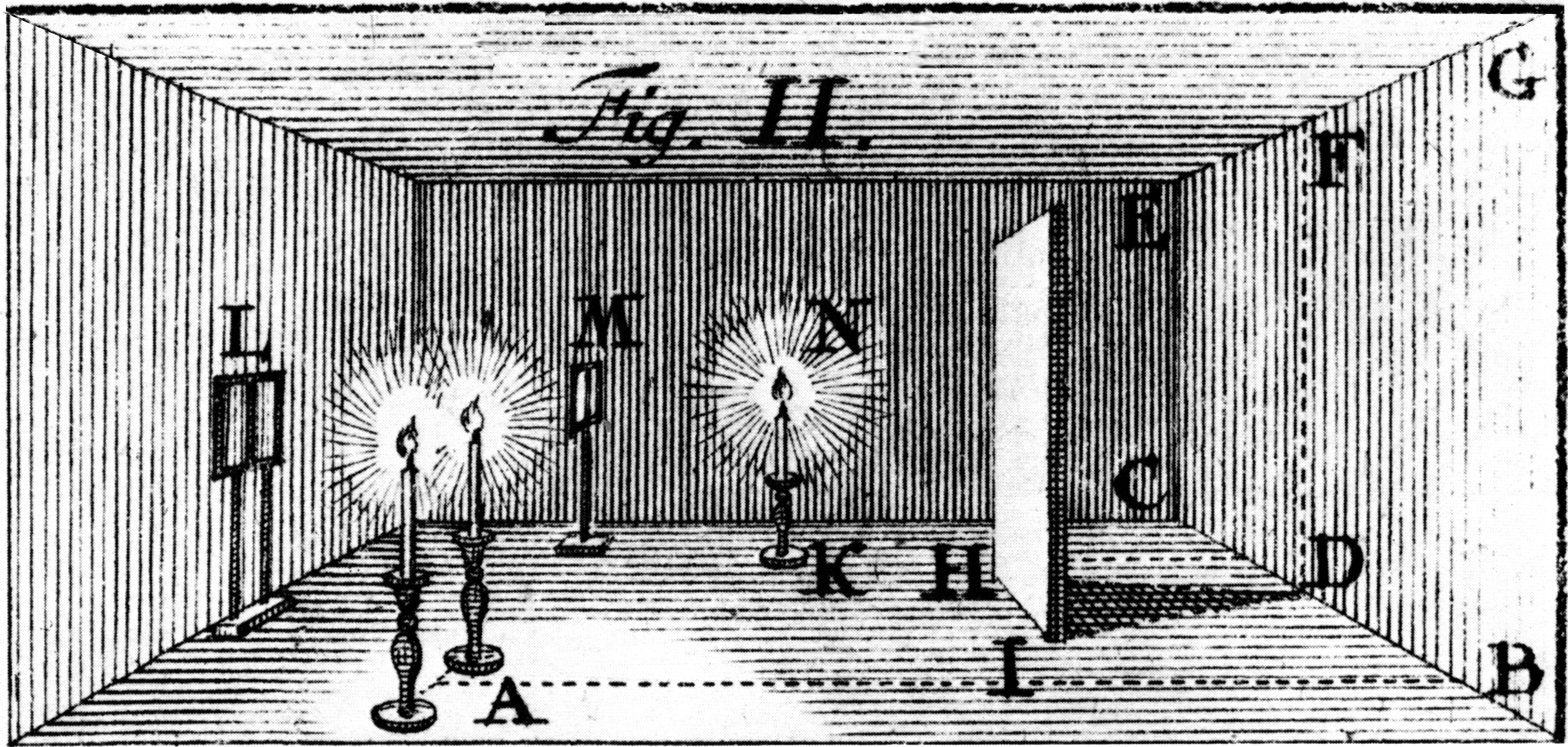
An example of visual photometry from Photometria. The vertical screen produces field EFDC illuminated by the single candle and adjacent field GFDB illuminated by two candles. The candle distances are changed until the brightness on either side of FD is the same. The relative illuminating power can then be determined from the candle distances.

2. Reflectance and transmittance of glass and other common materials

Using visual photometry, Lambert presented the results of many experimental determinations of specular and diffuse reflectance, as well as the transmittance of panes of glass and lenses. Among the most ingenious experiments he conducted was to determine the reflectance of the interior surface of a pane of glass.

3. Luminous radiative transfer between surfaces

Assuming diffuse surfaces and the three laws of photometry, Lambert used Calculus to find the transfer of light between surfaces of various sizes, shapes, and orientations. He originated the concept of the per-unit transfer of flux between surfaces and in Photometria showed the closed form for many double, triple, and quadruple integrals which gave the equations for many different geometric arrangements of surfaces. Today, these fundamental quantities are called View Factors, Shape Factors, or Configuration Factors and are used in radiative heat transfer and in computer graphics.

4. Brightness and pupil size

Lambert measured his own pupil diameter by viewing it in a mirror. He measured the change in diameter as he viewed a larger or smaller part of a candle flame. This is the first known attempt to quantify pupillary light reflex.

5. Atmospheric refraction and absorption

Using the laws of photometry and a great deal of geometry, Lambert calculated the times and depths of twilight.

6. Astronomic photometry

Assuming that the planets had diffusely reflective surfaces, Lambert attempted to determine the amount of their reflectance, given their relative brightness and known distance from the sun. A century later, Zöllner studied Photometria and picked up where Lambert left off, and initiated the field of astrophysics.

7. Demonstration of additive color mixing and colorimetry

Lambert was the first to record the results of additive color mixing. By simultaneous transmission and reflection from a pane of glass, he superimposed the images of two different colored patches of paper and noted the resulting additive color.

8. Daylighting calculations

Assuming the sky was a luminous dome, Lambert calculated the illumination by skylight through a window, and the light occluded and interreflected by walls and partitions.

== Topics ==
Lambert's book is fundamentally experimental. The forty experiments described in Photometria were conducted by Lambert between 1755 and 1760, after he decided to write a treatise on light measurement. His interest in acquiring experimental data spanned several fields: optics, thermometry, pyrometry, hydrometry, and magnetics. This interest in experimental data and its analysis, so evident in Photometria, is also present in other articles and books Lambert produced. For his optics work, extremely limited equipment sufficed: a few panes of glass, convex and concave lenses, mirrors, prisms, paper and cardboard, pigments, candles, and the means to measure distances and angles.

Lambert's book is also mathematical. Though he knew that the physical nature of light was unknown (it would be 150 years before the wave-particle duality was established) he was certain that light's interaction with materials and its effect on vision could be quantified. Mathematics was for Lambert not only indispensable for this quantification but also the indisputable sign of rigor. He used linear algebra and calculus extensively with matter-of-fact confidence that was uncommon in optical works of the time. On this basis, Photometria is certainly uncharacteristic of mid-18th century works.

== Writing and publication ==
Lambert began conducting photometric experiments in 1755 and by August 1757 had enough material to begin writing. From the references in Photometria and the catalogue of his library auctioned after his death, it is clear that Lambert consulted the optical works of Isaac Newton, Pierre Bouguer, Leonhard Euler, Christiaan Huygens, Robert Smith, and Abraham Gotthelf Kästner. He finished Photometria in Augsburg in February 1760 and the printer had the book available by June 1760.

Maria Jakobina Klett (1709–1795) was the owner of Eberhard Klett Verlag, one of the most important Augsburg “Protestant publishers.” She published many technical books, including Lambert’s Photometria, and 10 of his other works. Klett used Christoph Peter Detleffsen (1731–1774) to print Photometria. Its first and only printing was small, and within 10 years copies were difficult to obtain. In Joseph Priestley's survey of optics of 1772, “Lambert’s Photometrie” appears in the list of books not yet procured. Priestley makes a specific reference to Photometria; that it was an important book but unprocurable.

An abridged German translation of Photometria appeared in 1892, a French translation in 1997, and an English translation in 2000.

== Later influence ==
Photometria presented significant advances and it was, perhaps, for that very reason that its appearance was greeted with general indifference. The central optical question in the middle of the 18th century was: what is the nature of light? Lambert's work was not related to this issue at all and so Photometria received no immediate systematic evaluation, and was not incorporated into the mainstream of optical science. The first appraisal of Photometria appeared in 1776 in Georg Simon Klügel’s German translation of Priestley’s 1772 survey of optics. An elaborate reworking and annotation appeared in 1777.

Photometria was not seriously evaluated and utilized until nearly a century after its publication, when the science of astronomy and the commerce of gas lighting needed photometry. Fifty years after that, Illuminating Engineering took up Lambert's results as the basis for lighting calculations that accompanied the great expanse of lighting early in the 20th century. Fifty years after that, computer graphics took up Lambert's results as the basis for radiosity calculations required to produce architectural renderings. Photometria had a significant, though long-delayed influence on technology and commerce once the Industrial Revolution was well underway, and is the reason that it was one of the books listed in Printing and the Mind of Man.

== See also ==
- Beer–Lambert law (Lambert–Beer law, Beer–Lambert–Bouguer law)
- lambert (unit)
- Lambert's cosine law
- Lambertian reflectance
