= Leonard Hanssen =

American physicist

- Education: Seattle University (B.S.); Cornell University (Ph.D.)
- Scientific career
- Fields: Physics, Metrology
- Workplaces: National Institute of Standards and Technology

Leonard Hanssen is an American physicist at the National Institute of Standards and Technology (NIST). He is the project leader for infrared spectrophotometry in the Sensor Science Division of the Physical Measurement Laboratory. Hanssen is responsible for the realizing and maintaining NIST's scales for spectral reflectance, transmittance, and emittance of materials at infrared wavelengths. He is an expert in infrared spectrophotometry and integrating sphere design and applications.

== Education ==
Hanssen earned B.S. degrees in physics and mathematics at Seattle University. He completed an M.S. in physics and a Ph.D. in experimental physics at Cornell University. His 1985 dissertation was titled IR surface electromagnetic-wave measurement of hydrogen adsorption and surface reconstruction on W(100).

== Career ==
Following the completion of his Ph.D., Hanssen worked at TRW Defense and Space Systems, Sachs Freeman Associates, and the Naval Research Laboratory. In 1990, Hanssen moved to the National Institute of Standards and Technology (NIST) where he is currently employed. At NIST, Hanssen is responsible for realizing and maintaining the United States scales for infrared spectral reflectance, transmittance, and emittance of materials. He manages the Fourier Transform Infrared Spectrophotometry (FTIS) Facility, which was developed to take low uncertainty measurements. The FTIS Facility employs a Fourier-transform infrared spectrophotometer and custom integrating sphere to measure absolute infrared reflectance, transmittance, and absorbance. The measurement method was developed by Hanssen and is notable for its use in measuring both highly and weakly reflecting media.

Hanssen is a Fellow of SPIE and a member of multiple professional societies, including the Optical Society, the Council for the Optical Radiation Measurements (CORM), the ASTM International, and the American Geophysical Union. Between 1998 and 2020, he was an 11 time SPIE conference chair and 5 time SPIE conference editor. Hanssen is involved in standards development with the International Organization for Standardization.

== Awards ==
Hanssen is the recipient of several awards, including the Arthur S. Flemming Award in the area of Applied Science (2002), the Department of Commerce Silver Medal (2007), the NIST Judson C. French Award (2009), and the Department of Commerce Gold Medal (2013). In 2018, he was named an SPIE Fellow.
