= 187 Lamberta =

Asteroid

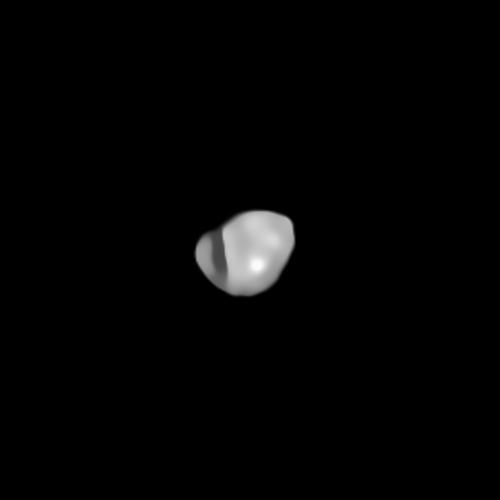
- VLT-SPHERE image of Lamberta

Discovery
- Discovered by: J. Coggia, 1878
- Discovery date: 11 April 1878

Designations
- Pronunciation: /læmˈbɜːrtə/
- Alternative designations: A878 GB; 1946 LB; 1948 XR
- Minor planet category: Main belt

Orbital characteristics
- Epoch 31 July 2016 (JD 2457600.5)
- Uncertainty parameter 0
- Observation arc: 113.41 yr (41424 d)
- Aphelion: 3.3856 AU (506.48 Gm)
- Perihelion: 2.0695 AU (309.59 Gm)
- Semi-major axis: 2.7276 AU (408.04 Gm)
- Eccentricity: 0.24126
- Orbital period (sidereal): 4.50 yr (1645.3 d)
- Mean anomaly: 217.42°
- Mean motion: 0° 13^{m} 7.68^{s} / day
- Inclination: 10.588°
- Longitude of ascending node: 21.707°
- Argument of perihelion: 196.93°
- Earth MOID: 1.07102 AU (160.222 Gm)
- Jupiter MOID: 1.60105 AU (239.514 Gm)
- T_{Jupiter}: 3.289

Physical characteristics
- Dimensions: 151 × 122 × 130 km (± 9 × 8 × 8 km)
- Mean diameter: 141±2 km
- Mass: (1.9±0.3)×10^{18} kg (composite estimate) (1.84±0.36)×10^{18} kg (Note: Calculated from its standard gravitational parameter GM = 0.123±0.024 km^{3}/s^{2}.)
- Mean density: 1.28±0.22 g/cm^{3} 1.26±0.25 g/cm^{3}
- Synodic rotation period: 10.667033±0.000002 h
- Axial tilt: 179°
- Pole ecliptic longitude: 115°±2°
- Pole ecliptic latitude: −79°±2°
- Geometric albedo: 0.052 (calculated); 0.044±0.007; 0.0647 ± 0.0135
- Spectral type: C (Tholen)
- Absolute magnitude (H): 7.98, 8.37, 7.980

187 Lamberta is a main-belt asteroid that was discovered by Corsican-born French astronomer Jérôme Eugène Coggia on April 11, 1878. It was named after the astronomer Johann Heinrich Lambert. This was the second of Coggia's five asteroid discoveries.

This object is orbiting the Sun at a distance of 2.73 AU with a moderate eccentricity of 0.24 and an orbital period of 4.50 years. The orbital plane is inclined at an angle of 10.6° to the plane of the ecliptic. It is spinning with a rotation period of 10.67 hours.

The spectrum matches a classification of a C-type asteroid, which may mean it has a composition of primitive carbonaceous materials. It is a dark object as indicated by the low albedo and has an estimated size of about 141 km.
