= Lambert's cosine law =

Optical Phenomenon

In optics, Lambert's cosine law says that the observed radiant intensity or luminous intensity from an ideal diffusely reflecting surface or ideal diffuse radiator is directly proportional to the cosine of the angle θ between the observer's line of sight and the surface normal; I = I_{0} cos θ. The law is also known as the cosine emission law or Lambert's emission law. It is named after Johann Heinrich Lambert, from his Photometria, published in 1760.

A surface which obeys Lambert's law is said to be Lambertian, and exhibits Lambertian reflectance. Such a surface has a constant radiance/luminance, regardless of the angle from which it is observed; a single human eye perceives such a surface as having a constant brightness, regardless of the angle from which the eye observes the surface. It has the same radiance because, although the emitted power from a given area element is reduced by the cosine of the emission angle, the solid angle, subtended by surface visible to the viewer, is reduced by the very same amount. Because the ratio between power and solid angle is constant, radiance (power per unit solid angle per unit projected source area) stays the same.

== Lambertian scatterers and radiators ==
When an area element is radiating as a result of being illuminated by an external source, the irradiance (energy or photons /time/area) landing on that area element will be proportional to the cosine of the angle between the illuminating source and the normal. A Lambertian scatterer will then scatter this light according to the same cosine law as a Lambertian emitter. This means that although the radiance of the surface depends on the angle from the normal to the illuminating source, it will not depend on the angle from the normal to the observer. For example, if the moon were a Lambertian scatterer, one would expect to see its scattered brightness appreciably diminish towards the terminator due to the increased angle at which sunlight hit the surface. The fact that it does not diminish illustrates that the moon is not a Lambertian scatterer, and in fact tends to scatter more light into the oblique angles than a Lambertian scatterer.

The emission of a Lambertian radiator does not depend on the amount of incident radiation, but rather from radiation originating in the emitting body itself. For example, if the sun were a Lambertian radiator, one would expect to see a constant brightness across the entire solar disc. The fact that the sun exhibits limb darkening in the visible region illustrates that it is not a Lambertian radiator. A black body is an example of a Lambertian radiator. According to Tatum, "In discussing the properties of reflecting surfaces, one often distinguishes between two extreme cases. At the one hand is the perfectly diffusing lambertian surface; blotting paper is sometimes cited as a near lambertian example. The other extreme is the perfectly reflecting surface, or specular reflection (Latin speculum, a mirror), in which the angle of reflection equals the angle of incidence."

== Details of equal brightness effect ==
Figure 1: Emission rate (photons/s) in a normal and off-normal direction. The number of photons/sec directed into any wedge is proportional to the area of the wedge.

Figure 2: Observed intensity (photons/(s·m^{2}·sr)) for a normal and off-normal observer; dA_{0} is the area of the observing aperture and dΩ is the solid angle subtended by the aperture from the viewpoint of the emitting area element.

The situation for a Lambertian surface (emitting or scattering) is illustrated in Figures 1 and 2. For conceptual clarity we will think in terms of photons rather than energy or luminous energy. The wedges in the circle each represent an equal angle dΩ, of an arbitrarily chosen size, and for a Lambertian surface, the number of photons per second emitted into each wedge is proportional to the area of the wedge.

The length of each wedge is the product of the diameter of the circle and cos(θ). The maximum rate of photon emission per unit solid angle is along the normal, and diminishes to zero for θ = 90°. In mathematical terms, the radiance along the normal is I photons/(s·m^{2}·sr) and the number of photons per second emitted into the vertical wedge is I dΩ dA. The number of photons per second emitted into the wedge at angle θ is I cos(θ) dΩ dA.

Figure 2 represents what an observer sees. The observer directly above the area element will be seeing the scene through an aperture of area dA_{0} and the area element dA will subtend a (solid) angle of dΩ_{0}, which is a portion of the observer's total angular field-of-view of the scene. Since the wedge size dΩ was chosen arbitrarily, for convenience we may assume without loss of generality that it coincides with the solid angle subtended by the aperture when "viewed" from the locus of the emitting area element dA. Thus the normal observer will then be recording the same I dΩ dA photons per second emission derived above and will measure a radiance of

$I_0=\frac{I\, d\Omega\, dA}{d\Omega_0\, dA_0}$ photons/(s·m^{2}·sr).

The observer at angle θ to the normal will be seeing the scene through the same aperture of area dA_{0} (still corresponding to a dΩ wedge) and from this oblique vantage the area element dA is foreshortened and will subtend a (solid) angle of dΩ_{0} cos(θ). This observer will be recording I cos(θ) dΩ dA photons per second, and so will be measuring a radiance of

$I_0=\frac{I \cos(\theta)\, d\Omega\, dA}{d\Omega_0\, \cos(\theta)\, dA_0} =\frac{I\, d\Omega\, dA}{d\Omega_0\, dA_0}$ photons/(s·m^{2}·sr),

which is the same as the normal observer. In the words of Tatum, "Thus the radiance of a lambertian radiating surface is independent of the angle from which it is viewed. Lambertian surfaces radiate isotropically. For a reflecting surface to be lambertian, it is required that the radiance be independent not only of the angle from which it is viewed, but also of the angle from which it is irradiated (or illuminated)." In the words of Yeo, "To put it in lay terms, the brightness of a Lambertian (or perfect diffuse reflector) remains constant as you view it from different angles. This is because, the change in intensity with angle (the cosine relationship) is countered by an equal but opposite change in the projected surface area that you view (also a cosine relationship). Thus the Lambertian surface will possess the same brightness (luminance or radiance) regardless of the angle that you view it from."

== Relating peak luminous intensity and luminous flux ==
In general, the luminous intensity of a point on a surface varies by direction; for a Lambertian surface, that distribution is defined by the cosine law, with peak luminous intensity in the normal direction. Thus when the Lambertian assumption holds, we can calculate the total luminous flux, $F_\text{tot}$, from the peak luminous intensity, $I_{\max}$, by integrating the cosine law:
$$\begin{align}
F_\text{tot} &= \int_0^{2\pi} \int_0^{\pi/2} \cos(\theta) \, I_{\max}\, \sin(\theta)\,d\theta\,d\phi\\
&= 2\pi\cdot I_{\max}\int_0^{\pi/2}\cos(\theta)\sin(\theta)\,d\theta \\
&= 2\pi\cdot I_{\max}\int_0^{\pi/2}\frac{\sin(2\theta)}{2}\,d\theta
\end{align}$$
and so

$$F_\text{tot}=\pi\,\mathrm{sr}\cdot I_{\max}$$

where $\sin(\theta)$ is the determinant of the Jacobian matrix for the unit sphere, and realizing that $I_{\max}$ is luminous flux per steradian. According to Tatum, "These relations apply equally to subscripted flux and intensity and to luminous flux and luminous intensity."

== See also ==
- Transmittance
- Reflectivity
- Passive solar building design
- Sun path
