= Janice M. Morse =

New Zealand-born nursing researcher

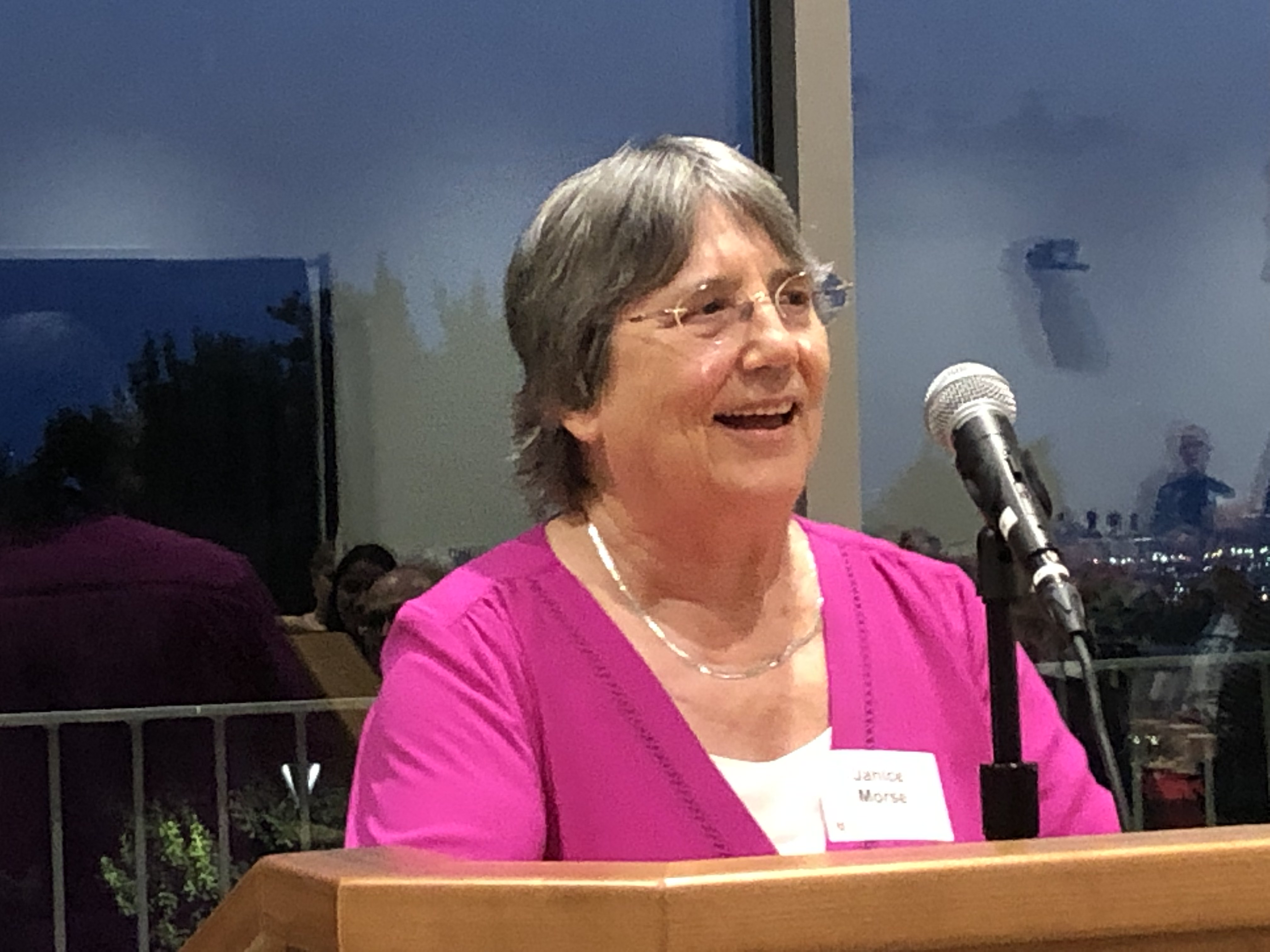
Morse giving a presentation at a conference (2019).

Janice Margaret Morse (née Hambleton, born 15 December 1945) is an anthropologist and nursing researcher who is best known as the founder of the field of qualitative health research.

She has taught in the United States and Canada. She received PhDs in transcultural nursing and in anthropology at the University of Utah, where she later held a presidential endowed chair in the College of Nursing. She is also a Distinguished Professor Emeritus at the University of Utah and professor emeritus at the University of Alberta. She is founder of three journals and created four scholarly book series on qualitative research. She was the founding director of the International Institute of Qualitative Methodology at the University of Alberta, the longest standing research institute on qualitative inquiry in the world.

== Early life and education ==
Morse was born in Blackburn, Lancashire, United Kingdom, to New Zealand parents. She grew up in Greymouth, New Zealand, in the South Island. Morse received her RN at Grey Hospital School of Nursing and practiced nursing at Royal Victoria Infirmary in Newcastle upon Tyne, UK, and Hutt Hospital in New Zealand before moving to the US. She received a BA in nursing and MA in transcultural nursing from Pennsylvania State University. At the University of Utah, she was awarded an MA in physical anthropology in 1978, then simultaneous PhDs in physical anthropology and transcultural nursing in 1981. Her two dissertations dealt with cultural coping mechanisms for reducing childbirth pain and infant feeding and health among the people of Fiji.

== Professional career ==
Morse began her academic career at the University of Alberta, where she advanced from associate professor and clinical researcher to full professor by 1986. In 1996, after a five-year stint as professor at the Pennsylvania State University School of Nursing, she returned to the University of Alberta, where she served as professor and launched the International Institute of Qualitative Methodology in the Faculty of Nursing in 1998. She was awarded emeritus status at the University of Alberta in 2007 when she moved to the University of Utah. She was made a Distinguished Professor at the University of Utah in 2019.

== Qualitative health research ==
With a dual background in healthcare and anthropology, Morse launched the field of qualitative health research, the practice of using qualitative research methods to study health care and health settings. Her major intellectual contributions in this area include developing theoretical coalescence, criteria for rigor, and generalizability for qualitative studies. These topics challenged the long-standing tradition in health and medical fields, which focused on clinical trials and analysis of statistical data. She is also regarded as one of the founders of mixed methods research, insisting that mixed methods fully engage qualitative methodologies into the study.

Morse established the major professional and scholarly infrastructure items that support qualitative health research. In 1991, she convened the first international conference on the topic in Edmonton. After organizing three subsequent qualitative health research conferences, she launched the International Institute for Qualitative Methodology (IIQM) at the University of Alberta. As founder, director, and later scientific director of the institute, Morse launched numerous initiatives to aid the development of qualitative methodology. IIQM ran two conferences and a week of workshops each year, attracting thousands of scholars from around the world. In addition to the journals, Qual Press was launched to publish original research and produced 11 volumes. It was later distributed by Left Coast Press and then by Routledge. Recognizing the importance of internationalizing the practice of qualitative research, Morse created a network of over 100 corresponding sites in 30 countries. Researchers from corresponding sites came as visiting scholars to Alberta to improve their research skills and Alberta researchers were sent around the world to help teach qualitative methodology in other countries.

Morse founded the first journal in the field, Qualitative Health Research (Sage Publishing, 1991) and edited it from its inception until retiring as editor-in-chief in 2021. She also founded and served as editor of two additional journals, the International Journal of Qualitative Methodology (2001), an open access digital publication that welcomes submissions in any language and provides translation services for them, and Global Qualitative Nursing Research (2014).

Her edited books Qualitative Nursing Research: A Contemporary Dialogue (1989) and Critical Issues in Qualitative Research Methods (1994) both won the American Journal of Nursing Book of the Year Award. Completing a Qualitative Project: Details and Dialogue (1997) was selected as one of the best health science books of 1997 by Doody's Review Service.

With her departure from Alberta to Utah in 2007, Morse launched an international organization, Global Congress for Qualitative Health Research, which hosts an annual international conference.

== Nursing research ==
Morse's main contribution in nursing research relates to understanding and controlling patient falls. With Robert Morse, she created the Morse Fall Scale, a six-point scale to predict a patient's risk of falling. She identified methods of fall interventions, and the provision of safe care with the removal of patient restraints. Morse has also published extensively on patient comfort, nonpharmaceutical means of reducing patient suffering, menarche, breastfeeding, nurse-patient interactions, and transcultural nursing. She developed nursing concepts, advanced methods of concept analysis, and mid-range theories in hope, suffering, comforting, and other clinical nursing research methods.

== Publications and editorial roles ==
- Nursing Research: The application of qualitative approaches (with P.A. Field), 1985, Aspen; 2nd edition, 1990, Chapman & Hall; 3rd edition, 1995, Sage; 4th edition, 2000, Nelson Thornes.
- Qualitative Nursing Research: A Contemporary Dialogue (editor), 1989, Sage
- Critical Issues in Qualitative Research Methods (editor), 1994, Sage
- Preventing Patient Falls, 1997, Sage; 2nd edition, 2009, Springer
- Qualitative Health Research (editor), 1992, Nelson Thornes; 1995, Sage
- The Illness Experience: Dimensions of Suffering (with J. Johnson), 1991, Sage
- Developing Grounded Theory: The Second Generation (editor with Barbara J. Bowers, Kathy Charmaz, Juliet Corbin, Phyllis Noerager Stern, and Adele E. Clarke), 2009, Left Coast/Routledge; 2nd edition, 2021, Routledge
- Completing a Qualitative Project: Details and Dialogue, 1997, Sage
- The nature of qualitative evidence (with J. Swanson and A. Kuzel), 2001, Sage
- Readme First for a User’s Guide to Qualitative Methods (with L. Richards), 2002, Sage; 2nd edition, 2007; 3rd edition, 2012
- Mixed-Method Design: Principles and Procedures (with L. Niehaus), 2009, Left Coast/Routledge
- Qualitative Health Research: Creating a New Discipline, 2012, Left Coast/Routledge
- Qualitatively-Driven Mixed-Method Designs, 2017, Left Coast/Routledge; 2nd edition, 2018, Routledge
- Analyzing and Conceptualizing the Theoretical Foundations of Nursing, 2017, Springer

== Recognition ==
Morse has been given lifetime achievement awards from the International Congress on Qualitative Inquiry (2011) and the International Institute for Qualitative Methodology (2019). She received the Episteme Award from Sigma Theta Tau in 1997. She was an inaugural inductee of Sigma Theta Tau International's Nurse Researcher Hall of Fame.

She is a fellow of the American Academy of Nursing, American Anthropological Association, Society for Applied Anthropology, and Canadian Academy of Health Sciences. Morse has honorary doctorates from the Université Laval, Athabasca University, and the University of Newcastle. She received the International Nursing Research Award from the American Nurses Association Council of Nurse Researchers in 1991.

Morse's citations were ranked, by AD Scientific Index 2023, in the top 2% of all scientists worldwide and ranked 2nd in the Nursing and Midwifery category in North America.
