= Falls in older adults =

Age-related health problem

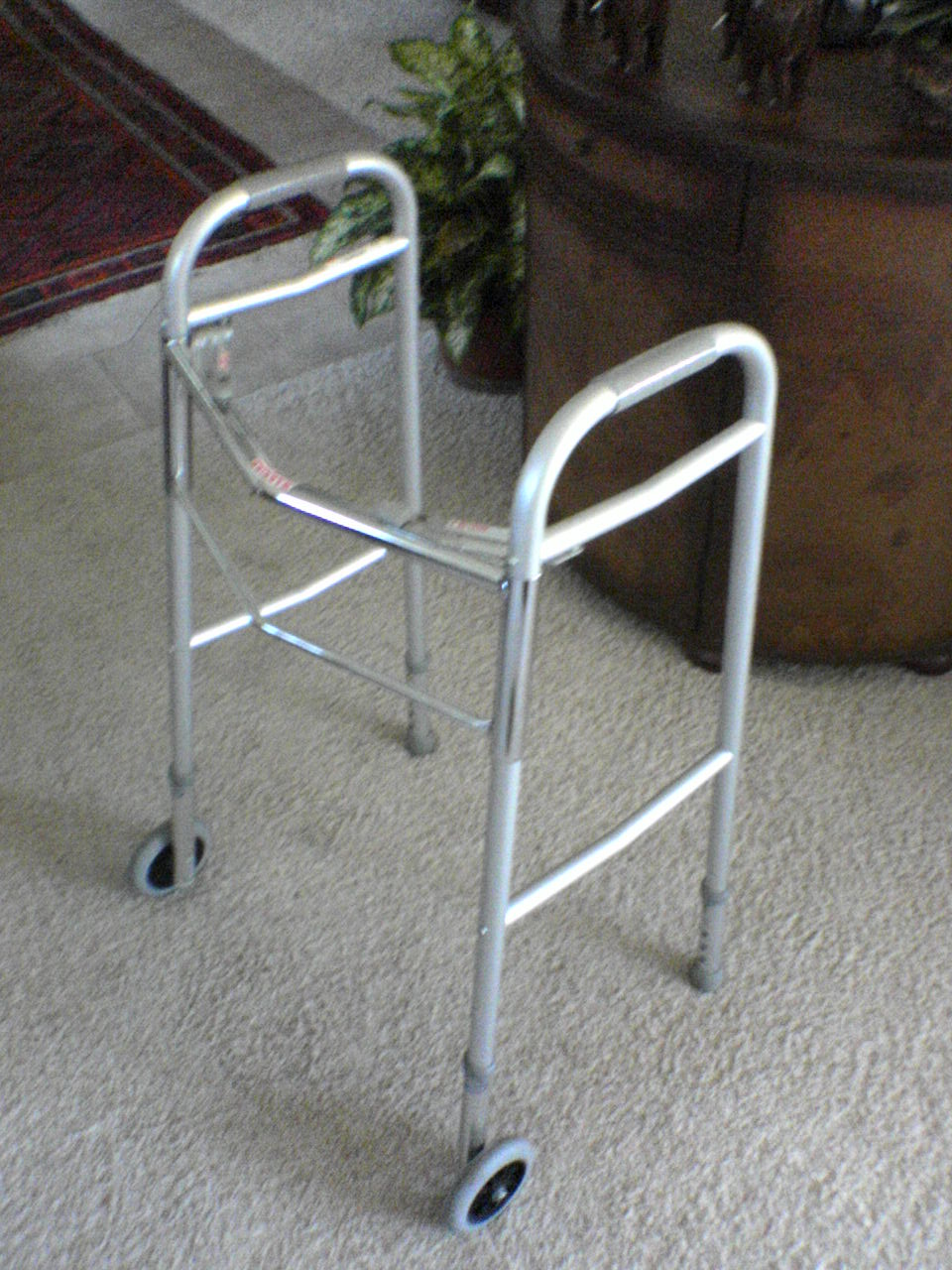
- Front-wheeled walker
- Specialty: Emergency medicine, gerontology

Accidental deaths in the United States

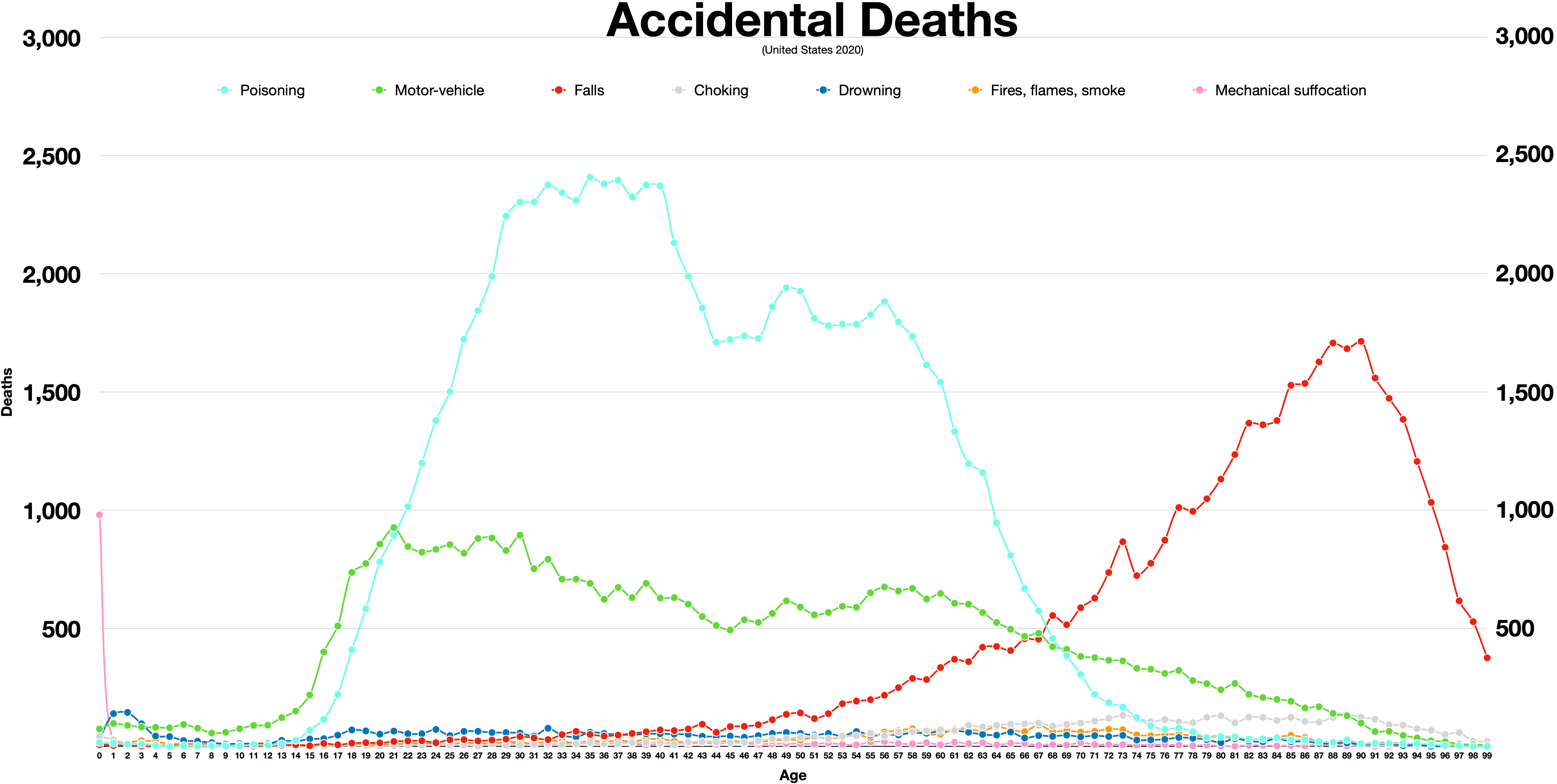
2020

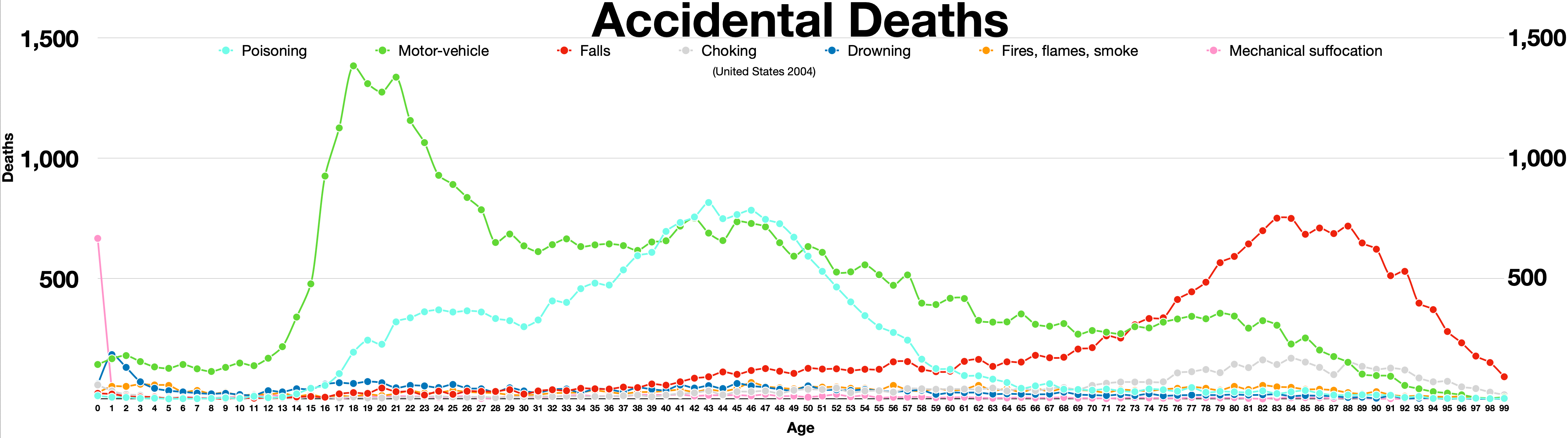
2004

Poisoning
Motor-vehicle
Falls
Choking
Drowning
Fires, flames, smoke
Suffocation

Falls in older adults are a significant cause of morbidity and mortality and are a major class of preventable injuries. Falling is one of the most common accidents that cause a loss of function, independence, and quality of life for older adults, and is usually precipitated by multiple risk factors. The cause of falling in old age is often multi-factorial, and a multidisciplinary approach may be needed both to prevent and to treat any injuries sustained.

The definition of a "fall" tends to vary depending on who is reporting the fall and to whom, though it is generally accepted that falling includes dropping from a high position to a low one, often quickly. However a fall does not necessarily mean falling to the ground: the individual could fall back into a chair or bed, and they may be assisted by another person to help slow down the fall and perhaps avoid injury. The severity of injury is generally related to the height of the fall and the individual's health, for example whether there is osteoporosis. The type of surface onto which the person falls is also important as harder surfaces can cause more severe injury.

Sometimes falls can be prevented by ensuring that interior surfaces are dry and free of clutter, carpets are tacked down, paths are well lit, hearing and vision are optimized, dizziness is minimized, alcohol intake is moderated, and shoes have low heels or rubber soles. External surfaces are harder to control but ideally, to reduce falls, it can be helpful to walk on surfaces that are not wet or icy, are well lit, and are flat; and to have hands and arms free to help regain balance or protect from a fall.

A review of clinical trial evidence by the European Food Safety Authority led to a recommendation that people over the age of 60 years should supplement their diet with vitamin D to reduce the risk of falling and bone fractures. Falls are an important aspect of geriatric medicine. In 2018, the United States Preventive Service Task Force actually recommended against vitamin D supplementation to help prevent falls, citing lack of association or conflicting results between the supplement and reduced falls in older adults. Rather, older adults should be screened for osteoporosis; and if diagnosed the need to slow or stop bone loss is paramount. This can be accomplished through proper nutrition, lifestyle changes, exercises, fall prevention strategies and some medications.

== Definition ==
Other definitions are more inclusive and do not exclude "major intrinsic events" as a fall. Falls are of concern within medical treatment facilities. Fall prevention is usually a priority in healthcare settings.

A 2006 review of literature identified the need for standardization of falls taxonomy due to the variation within research. The Prevention of Falls Network Europe (ProFane) taxonomy for the definition and reporting of falls aimed at mitigating this problem. ProFane recommended that a fall be defined as "an unexpected event in which the participants come to rest on the ground, floor, or lower level." The ProFane taxonomy is currently used as a framework to appraise falls-related research studies in Cochrane Systematic Reviews.

== Signs of the risk of falling ==
- A fear of falling or post fall psychological trauma. Anyone, but especially older adults may limit or refuse to move frequently or exercise for fear of recurrent falls and injury.
- History of falls
- History or presence of bruises or fractures
- Due to bed rest, perhaps from an acute or chronic illness:
  - Pneumonia
  - Pressure sores
  - Dehydration
  - Hypothermia
- Physical de-condition, weakness, or frailty
- "Risk factors for falls in order of evidence strength include a history of falls, impairment in balance, reduced muscle strength, visual problems, polypharmacy (defined as taking over four medications) or psychoactive drugs, gait difficulty, depression, orthostasis or dizziness, functional limits, age over 80 years, female sex, incontinence, cognitive difficulties, arthritis, diabetes, and pain"

== Symptoms or results of a fall ==
- Trauma
  - Mild injuries. Small bruises or scratches.
  - Moderate to severe injuries. Deep bruises (hematomas), any bone fracture, but commonly hip fractures, or head trauma.
  - Soft tissue injuries. Bilateral orbital haematomas (two black eyes) suggests that the person was probably not conscious as they fell as they did not manage to protect their face before they hit the ground.
  - Fractures and dislocations. 95% of hip fracture in older adults resulted from a fall.
- Disuse atrophy and muscle wasting from reduced physical activity during recovery periods, perhaps due to recovery of a moderate or severe injury from a fall or any other illness or injury.

== Causes ==
Falls are often caused by a number of factors such as intrinsic vs extrinsic or modifiable vs non-modifiable. The older adult who may fall could have risk factors for falling and only have problems when another factor appears. As such, management is often tailored to treating the factor that caused the fall, rather than all of the risk factors a patient has for falling. Risk factors may be grouped into intrinsic factors, such as existence of a specific ailment or disease. External or extrinsic factors include the environment and the way in which it may encourage or deter accidental falls. Such factors as lighting and illumination, personal aid equipment and floor traction are all important in fall prevention.

Modifiable risk factors can include items such as gait, strength, and balance deficits, medication used, home hazards, orthostatic hypotension, vision and hearing problems, foot issues or inappropriate footwear and the presence of comorbidities. This is the basis the US Center for Disease Control (CDC) STEADI (STEADI-Stopping Elderly Accidents, Deaths and Injuries) fall prevention initiative. Evidence supports the need for early identification or screening for fall risk, assessment of fall risk factors for the appropriate referral to evidence-based interventions that are patient-specific

=== Intrinsic factors ===
- Balance and gait
  - Organ and physiologic changes occur with age, such as muscle strength, the nervous system (which impacts balance, gait, vision and hearing)
  - As a result of stroke disease, Parkinsonism, arthritic changes, neuropathy, neuromuscular disease or vestibular disease.
- Visual motor reaction time problems
  - An extended reaction time will delay responses and compensations to standing or walking imbalances, thus increasing the likelihood of falls.
- Medications
  - Polypharmacy is common in older people (the take of 4 or more medications; high risk medications related to fall risk should also be avoided)
  - There is a list of high-risk medication related to falls in older adults that is derived from the Beer's list; general categories include antihypertensives, antihistamines, benzodiazepines, sedatives, antihyperglycemics and anticonvulsants
- Visual impairment
  - Visual impairments, glaucoma, macular degeneration and retinopathy increase the risk of falling and of hip fractures.
  - Bifocals and trifocals can increase the risk of falling as the lower portion of corrective lenses are optimized for distances approximately 18 in (46 cm), thus precluding clear vision of one's feet/floor, approximately 4.5–5.5 ft (1.4–1.7 m) below one's eyes.
- Cognitive problems
  - Dementia increases the likelihood of falls
- Cardiovascular causes
  - Orthostatic hypotension; Postprandial hypotension
  - Carotid sinus syndrome
  - Neurocardiogenic syncope– the commonest cause of syncope in A&E patients
  - Cardiac arrhythmias
  - Structural heart disease, such as valvular heart disease

=== Extrinsic factors ===
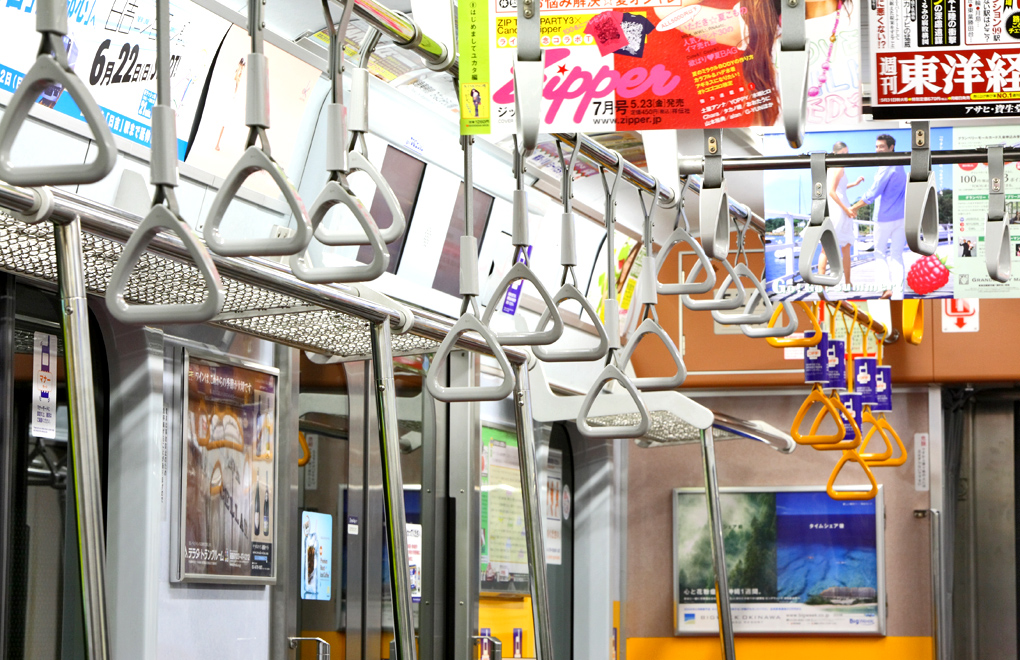
Hanging straps with triangular handles in a modern Japanese commuter train

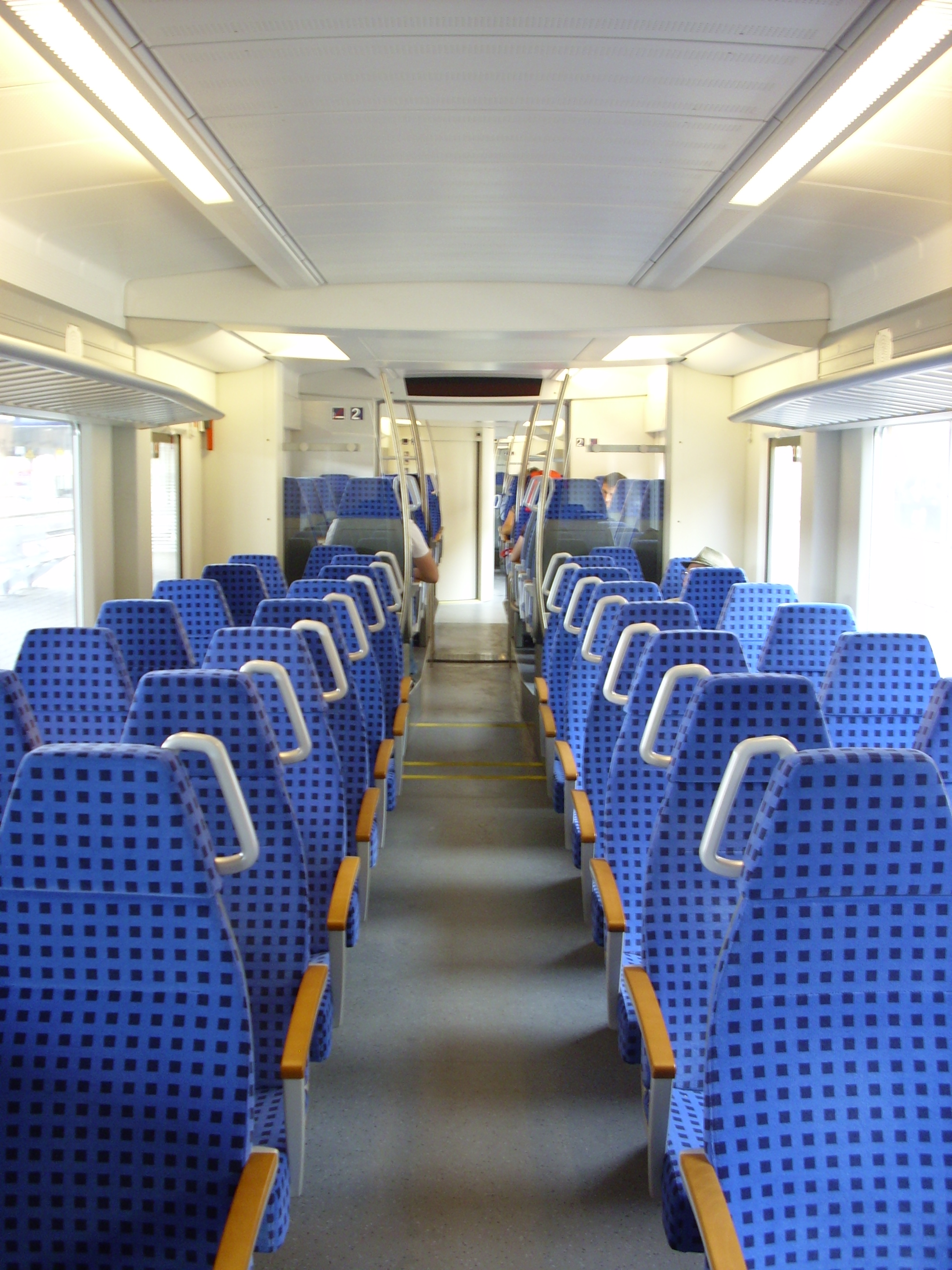
Grab rails on a longer-distance commuter train catering for mainly seated passengers

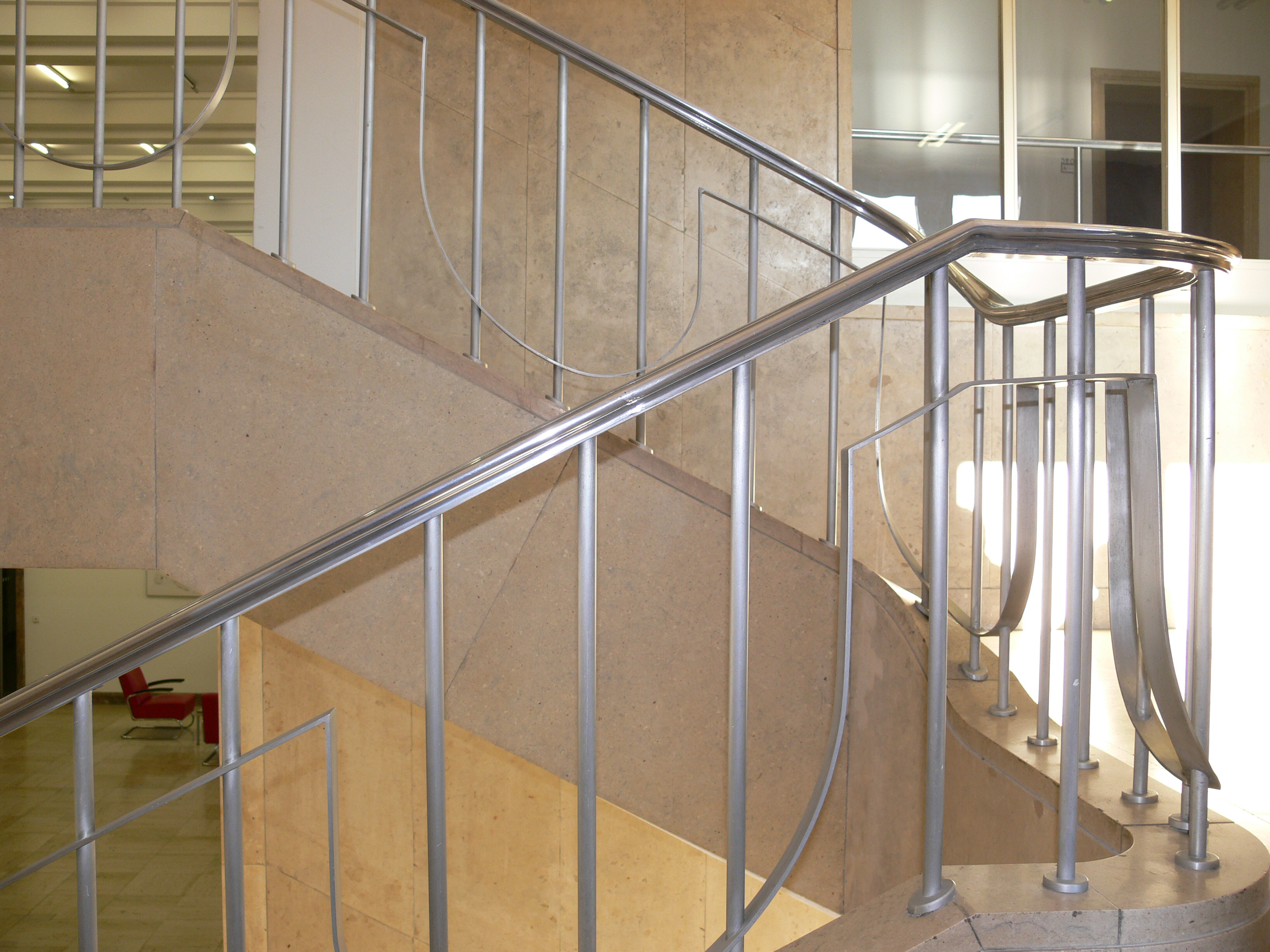
A staircase with metal handrails

These factors are often associated with the built environment (structure, features or buildings) in which people live and work, or community outdoors spaces naturally occurring.

- Poor lighting due to low luminance of existing lights or lamps, so preventing hazard identification and avoidance. Eyesight deteriorates with age, and extra lighting will be needed where seniors move frequently. The luminance provided by the bulbs used should be higher than normally accepted.
- Stairs with inadequate handrails, or too steep, encouraging trips and falls. Handrails should approach two inches in diameter as reduced hand strength and coordination are preferred over thinner options. Any grab bars are also of more benefit at larger diameters. The steps should be spaced widely with low risers, and surfaces should be slip-resistant. Softer surfaces can help limit impact injuries by cushioning loads.
- Doorways with adequate headroom so that the user's head does not hit the lintel. Doorways of low headroom (less than about 6 ft (1.8 m)) are common in old houses and cottages for example.
- Rugs/floor surfaces with low friction, causing poor traction and individual instability. All surfaces should have a high friction coefficient with shoe soles and limited clutter. Polished marble floors would be the poorest choice for bathroom or kitchen floors, where various water spills will exacerbate loss of friction.
- Clothing/footwear poorly fitted, shoes of low friction against floor. Rubber soles with ribs normally have a high friction coefficient or very smooth soles should be avoided as too much traction and too little can both present a fall hazard. Familiar footwear with medium levels of traction is preferred. Clothing should fit the user well, without trailing parts (hems falling below the heel and loose shoelaces) which could snag with obstacles.
- Lack of equipment/aids such as walking sticks or walking frames, such as Zimmer frames so as to improve user stability. Grab bars and hanging straps should be supplied plentifully, especially in critical areas where users may be vulnerable.
- The lower part of bifocals and trifocal spectacles provide good focus for reading but usually impair vision of items and obstacles five feet away, in the path of a walker. "Walking glasses" providing a sharp focus to the area immediately in front of a walker is recommended.

== Screening and diagnosis ==
There are multiple ways to screen older adults for their risk of falls. Commonly used are subjective questions asking older adults to report their falls or fear of falling. The subjective nature of screening questions, whether they are evidence-based or not, does not always provide an accurate risk screening. Though it can provide a place to start a conversation between older adult and health care provider or older adults and family members/caregivers.

The American Geriatrics Society and the British Geriatrics Society recommend that all older adults should be screened for "falls in the past year". Fall history is the strongest risk factor associated with subsequent falls. Older people who have experienced at least one fall in the last 6 months, or who believe that they may fall in the coming months, should be evaluated with the aim of reducing their risk of recurrent falls. Special attention should be aimed at persons who are living alone, when other fall risk factors are noted.

Many health institutions in the USA have developed screening questionnaires. Enquiry includes difficulty with walking and balance, medication use to help with sleep/mood, loss of sensation in feet, vision problems, fear of falling, and use of assistive devices for walking.

Older adults who report falls should be asked about their circumstances and frequency to assess risks from gait and balance which may be compromised. A clinician performs a fall risk assessment, to include history, physical exam, functional capability, and environment.

- For use in clinical settings: the United States Centers for Disease Control and Prevention created STEADI: a toolkit and Resource Algorithm for Fall Risk Screening, Assessment, and Intervention based on American and British Geriatrics Societies' clinical practice guideline for fall prevention
- For personal/individual use: The National Council on Aging created (in partnership between Amgen and the CDC Foundation with leveraged technical resources from the Centers for Disease Control and Prevention (CDC). the Falls Free Checkup: Answer 13 simple questions to get your falls risk score and resources to prevent falls.

Specific functional screens or tests can be completed by health professional to look at specific risk factors, such as muscle weakness or balance (i.e. Berg Balance Test, Timed up and Go). However, these screens or tests alone cannot define or predict fall risk.

Using the American Medical Association's Current Procedural Terminology (CPT) codes are for healthcare professionals to code services and procedures as part of care documentation for reimbursement of services, falls can be captured in a medical record for diagnostic and intervention purposes.

When assessing a person who has fallen, an eyewitness account of the incident is helpful. However, the person who fell may have been temporarily unconscious, and may not be able to give an accurate description of the fall. In practice, these eyewitness accounts are often unavailable or not fully reliable. Before moving someone who has fallen, ensure they are not injured, that they won't be injured if they are moved, and that you will not be injured if you try to assist in lifting or moving someone. When possible, get assistance before moving someone who has fallen and encourage them to seek out medical attention.

== Prevention ==
The relationship between the person at risk of falling and their environment is important for determining the risk falls and taking measures to prevent falls. An assessment with an occupational therapist may be helpful to determine an appropriate rehabilitation plan to prevent falls by taking into consideration both the person and their living environment. A large body of evidence shows that efforts to include exercise decrease the risk of falls, and yet the fear of falling can lead to a decrease in participation in physical exercise.

Possible interventions to prevent falls include:

=== Environmental adaptations ===
Improvements to the person's environment such as their home or workplace may help to reduce the risk of falling.

- A review of the current living conditions
- Adding safety devices, such as grab handles, high friction floors, as well as low power lighting at night to the person's home or work environment
- Identify and remove potential hazards
- Vision improvement

=== Behavioral interventions ===
- Regular exercise: lower limb strengthening exercise to increase muscle strength. Other forms of exercise, such as those involving gait, balance, co-ordination and functional tasks, may also help improve balance in older adults.
- A 2014 review concluded that exercise interventions may reduce fear of falling (FOF) in community-dwelling older adults immediately after the intervention, without evidence of long-term effects.
- Monitoring of medications and ongoing medical problems. For example, people with polymyalgia rheumatica often take long-term steroids, leading to osteoporosis. Research in the UK has also suggested that these people would benefit from a falls assessment when first diagnosed, and regular treatment reviews.
- Improvements to footwear and use of orthotic devices if required.
- Supplementation with vitamin D is not recommended in those without vitamin D deficiency for fall prevention in older adults.

=== Psychological interventions ===
Cognitive behavioral therapy (CBT) has been suggested as a prevention approach to improve confidence and help older people reduce the fear of falling. There is moderate evidence to suggest that this technique can be effective at reducing the fear of falling for up to and beyond 6 months. CBT appears to have a positive effect on activity avoidance and risk of depression; however, it is not clear whether CBT reduces the incidence of falls in older people.

=== Interventions to minimize the consequences of falls ===
- Hip protectors can decrease risk of hip fractures, and this intervention is used extensively in Scandanavin countries. Side pockets on the outside of the legs, with inserted foam is an easy intervention. Little or no effect reported on other fractures or falls.
- Treatment for osteoporosis

=== Hospital ===
People who are hospitalized are at risk for falling. A randomized trial showed that use of a tool kit reduced falls in hospitals. Nurses complete a valid fall risk assessment scale. From that, a software package develops customized fall prevention interventions to address patients' specific determinants of fall risk. The kit also has bed posters with brief text and an accompanying icon, patient education handouts, and plans of care, all communicating patient-specific alerts to key stakeholders.

=== Population-based interventions ===
Prevention approaches that target the whole population of older people in a particular area are defined as population-based interventions. These include policies put in place by governments for vitamin supplementation, maintenance programs to reduce risks in public spaces and homes, public health programs offering exercise classes and sharing resources widely (not just to people identified as being high risk), improving access to gyms (for example allowing seniors to access a gym for free if over a certain age). The evidence supporting population-based interventions is weak. It is not clear if population-based interventions that improve access to medications or nutritional program are effective.

== Epidemiology ==
The incidence of falls increases progressively with age. According to the existing scientific literature, around one-third of the elderly population experience one or more falls each year, while 10% experience multiple falls annually. For people over 80, the annual incidence of falls can reach 50%.

== History ==
Researchers have tried to create a consensual definition of a fall since the 1980s. Tinneti et al. defined a fall as "an event which results in a person coming to rest unintentionally on the ground or other lower level, not as a result of a major intrinsic event (such as a stroke) or overwhelming hazard."

== Economics ==
The health care impact and costs of falls in older adults are significantly rising all over the world. The cost of falls is categorized into two aspects: direct cost and indirect cost.

Direct costs are what patients and insurance companies pay for treating fall-related injuries. This includes fees for the hospital and nursing home, doctors and other professional services, rehabilitation, community-based services, use of medical equipment, prescription drugs, changes made to home and insurance processing.

Indirect costs include the loss of productivity of family caregivers and long-term effects of fall-related injuries such as disability, dependence on others and reduced quality of life.

In the United States alone, the total cost of falling injuries for people 65 and older was $80 billion in 2020. "Older adults incurred an estimated 922,428 inpatient and 2.3 million ED visits annually due to falls with combined annual costs of $19.8 billion" from 2016-2018. "The prevalence of falls in the world's older people was 26.5%", resulting in potential expenditures of health care, mortality and disability-adjusted life-years (DALYs)

== Research ==
A 2012 systematic review demonstrated that performing dual-task tests (for example, combining a walking task with a counting task) may help to predict people at increased risk of a fall.
