= Fiona Walter =

British physician and academic

Fiona M. Walter
- Education: University of Cambridge
- Scientific career
- Workplaces: University of Cambridge; Queen Mary University of London
- Thesis: Family history of common chronic disease in primary care : the patient's perspective (2007)

Fiona Mary Walter is a British medical doctor who is a professor and the director of the Wolfson Institute of Population Health at Queen Mary University of London. Her research considers the development of new diagnostics for the early detection and prevention of cancer.

== Early life and education ==
Walter studied medicine at the University of Cambridge, earning her Bachelor of Medicine, Bachelor of Surgery in 1983. She worked as a general practitioner in Cambridge, and completed a doctorate on chronic disease in primary care.

== Research and career ==
Walter was a reader in cancer research at the University of Cambridge, where she led Cancer Research UK's CanTest, a programme that looked to improve early detection of upper gastrointestinal cancer, and was involved with the National Institute for Health and Care Research Policy Research Unit in Cancer Awareness, Screening and Early Diagnosis. At Cambridge Walter worked in primary care oncology on the patient pathway.

Walter joined Queen Mary University of London in 2021. She was made Director of the Wolfson Institute of Population Health and co-lead of the Cancer Detection and Diagnosis Unit.

In 2023, she developed a ten-point plan that focussed on improve cancer services in the United Kingdom. She launched a new Centre for Cancer Screening, Prevention and Early Diagnosis at Queen Mary University of London in 2024.

She holds honorary positions at the University of Melbourne, in South Africa and in Zimbabwe.

== Selected publications ==
- Linda Birt; Scott, Suzanne; Debbie Cavers; Christine Campbell; Walter, Fiona (2016). "Member Checking: A Tool to Enhance Trustworthiness or Merely a Nod to Validation?". Qualitative Health Research. 26 (13): 1802–1811. doi:10.1177/1049732316654870. PMID 27340178. Wikidata Q39658080.
- Walter, Fiona; Andrew Webster; Scott, Suzanne; Emery, Jon (2011). "The Andersen Model of Total Patient Delay: a systematic review of its application in cancer diagnosis". Journal of Health Services Research and Policy. 17 (2): 110–118. doi:10.1258/jhsrp.2011.010113. PMC 3336942. PMID 22008712. Wikidata Q35913570.
- D Weller; Vedsted, Peter; G Rubin; et al. (2012). "The Aarhus statement: improving design and reporting of studies on early cancer diagnosis". British Journal of Cancer. 106 (7): 1262–1267. doi:10.1038/bjc.2012.68. PMC 3314787. PMID 22415239. Wikidata Q26852129.
