= Fall Prevention Center of Excellence =

The Fall Prevention Center of Excellence (FPCE) is a source of fall prevention information for older adults, families, caregivers, professionals, service providers, researchers, and policymakers. FPCE's aim is to provide leadership, create new knowledge, improve practices, and develop fall prevention programs.

The center's goals are to advance fall prevention as a public health priority and educate and train service providers and professionals in fall prevention. It also aims to develop and implement fall prevention programs that address the needs of older adults.

== History ==
To address the problem of falls, the Archstone Foundation held the first statewide Fall Prevention Summit in 2003 of over 150 stakeholders representing government, professional, and community organizations. A major outcome was the creation of FPCE with support from the Archstone Foundation to implement FP awareness and build a statewide FP infrastructure.

A background White Paper was developed prior to the conference. Afterwards, a Blueprint for Fall Prevention was created. In March 2004, a one-day event on fall prevention was held at the American Society on Aging/National Council on Aging Joint Conference. In January 2005, the Fall Prevention Center of Excellence was established.

== Partners and affiliates ==
=== Partners ===
FPCE is partnered with the University of Southern California's (USC) Andrus Gerontology Center (Andrus), and the Center for Successful Aging (CSA) at California State University, Fullerton.

Andrus serves as the program office, is responsible for administrative responsibilities and serves as the communication/dissemination site. They share their expertise in the environment, particularly home and community safety in relation to fall prevention, and they operate an executive certificate program in home modification. Their director of communications is Maria Henke and the co-director is Jon Pynoos.

CSA offers instructor training for a group physical activity program called FallProof. The instructors conduct group physical activity classes in the community. They specialize in balance and mobility as a strategy for fall risk reduction. The co-director is Debra Rose.

=== Affiliates ===
FPCE is affiliated with:

- The VA Greater Los Angeles Healthcare System Geriatric Research, Education and Clinical Center (GRECC)
- University of California Los Angeles (UCLA), Geffen School of Medicine
- The California Department of Public Health, Safe and Active Communities Branch (SACB)
- University of Southern California, School of Pharmacy (USC Pharmacy)

GRECC conducts research in fall prevention. They share their expertise in medical management of risk factors for falls and are skilled in evaluating fall prevention programs.

SACB works with Epidemiology and Prevention for Injury Control (EPIC) to track and identify causes and frequencies of fall-related injuries across the state. They promote fall prevention at the state level and share their expertise in improving programs and services available to reduce fall risk.

USC Pharmacy offers dual degrees in Pharmacy and Gerontology for students interested in pursuing geriatric pharmacy practice. They specialize in the pharmaceutical management of risk factors for falls.

FPCE:

- creates and distributes multilingual materials on its website,
- provides online and in-person education,
- provides technical assistance to 11 regional fall prevention coalitions in California,
- coordinates a Californian FP network,
- is developing a fall prevention program (InSTEP),
- has convened two statewide summits on FP.

FPCE is supported by the California Wellness Foundation, the Kaiser Foundation, The Eisner Foundation, the SCAN Foundation, and the Centers for Disease Control and Prevention (CDC). This support has augmented the resources provided initially by the Archstone Foundation and allowed FPCE to more widely reach older adults and underserved minorities by building the capacity of professionals and providers to address falls.

At the national level, FPCE's partners include the National Council on Aging (NCOA) and the Falls Free Coalition, the National Safety Council, Rebuilding Together, and the CDC. In California, FPCE works with organizations that represent older persons (e.g., AARP), non-government (e.g. Departments of Aging, Public Health, and Housing), health and social service providers, and caregiver organizations. Locally, FPCE partners with Area Agencies on Aging, the County Department of Public Health and the City and County Fire Departments. FPCE has an Advisory Board.

== Importance of fall prevention ==
Ranking in the top ten causes of death, disability, and healthcare expenditures (Rubenstein, 2006; Ganz et al., 2007), the rate of falls and their associated costs are staggering (Stevens et al., 2006). In Los Angeles County, home to 1.4 million people aged 60 or older, EPICenter data show that approximately one third fall each year. In 2010, there were more than 20,000 hospitalizations for falls among 65+ year olds with an average of $61,800 in medical cost per visit. In California, over 565,000 older people fell more than once in 2007 (Wallace et al., 2010) and the costs of falls in California could reach $6.6 billion in 2020 (Trent, written communication, 2010). The fear of falling can lead to depression, isolation, and loss of independence for older adults.

To address the problem of falls, the Archstone Foundation held the first statewide Fall Prevention Summit in 2003 of over 150 stakeholders representing government, professional, and community organizations. An outcome was the creation of FPCE with support from the Archstone Foundation.

== Projects ==
=== Fall Prevention Coalition – Los Angeles (FPC-LA) ===
Funded by The Kaiser Foundation, the vision of FPC-LA is promoting safe fall-free aging. Its mission is to reduce fall risk for older adults through education, planning, and community action across Los Angeles County. Coalition members, including representatives from public, private, and non-profit organizations, have identified “fall hotspots”- zip codes where older people fall at high rates - to help target programs, conducted a Walkability Workshop to highlight hazards to pedestrians such as uneven sidewalks and unsafe street crossings, created a presentation for older adults that is being used by the Department of Public Health Speakers Bureau, and developed The Falling Monologues, a series of performances by an older adult scriptwriter and actors to raise awareness about falls.

=== FP Connect ===
This project is funded by the Archstone Foundation. Emergency Medical Services (EMS) personnel are often the first to arrive at the scene of a fall. FP Connect aims to educate Los Angeles County EMS personnel to address fall risks and reduce repeat falls. It enhances the ability of Fire/EMS to respond to falls effectively by providing LACoFD with an information and assessment tool that enables Fire/EMS personnel to conduct a home assessment and connect older adults who have fallen with community services.

=== Pills & spills ===
Funded by the SCAN Foundation, the purpose of Pills & Spills is to help direct care workers in nursing homes and older adults’ homes reduce falls through medication and environmental interventions. The Fall Prevention Center of Excellence and the USC School of Pharmacy jointly created six 1-hour in-service sessions with corresponding case studies and video segments of teaching material. Topics include:

- Stop falls: addressing fall risk factors,
- Aging, health, and falls,
- Medical conditions that contribute to falls,
- Recognizing the link between medications and falls,
- Personalizing fall prevention: the environment,
- The 4Ps: Pain, Positioning, Potty, Possessions.

=== Home Safety Adaptations for the Elderly (Home SAFE) ===
Funded by the Eisner Foundation, the mission of Home SAFE is to make home safety a component of successful aging and preventive health in LA County by increasing activities and awareness among consumers, professionals, organizations and the wider community. The project's home safety focus areas include:

- fall prevention (elimination of hazards such as throw rugs, clutter),
- home modification (environmental adaptations such as grab bars, better lighting),
- fire protection measures (smoke alarms and escape plans),
- healthy home strategies (carbon monoxide detectors, clean furnace).

An outcome is the development of the Home Safety in Your Community: A Toolkit for Change, with home safety information in English, Chinese, Korean, and Spanish.

=== Increasing Stability through Evaluation and Practice (InSTEP) ===
The project is funded by the Archstone Foundation to develop a program aimed at reducing fall risk for older persons at moderate to high risk of falls. FPCE staff analyzed the effectiveness of three basic InSTEP models, which differ by intensity of professional involvement (high, medium and low). Validated instruments were used to measure fall risk behaviors, concerns about falling, fall history, and current physical activities. Multiple physical performance tests were also conducted pre- and post-intervention.

=== California Senior Fall Prevention Projects: Fall Prevention Coalition Development ===
The project is funded by the Archstone Foundation. From 2006–2009, ten agencies were supported to create/strengthen fall prevention coalitions in two major areas in California. FPCE provided technical assistance and evaluated their progress. Coalitions conducted assessments to identify their community's greatest needs, created three-year strategic plans to address those needs, and employed strategies to build local capacity to reduce fall risk. During the grant period, the coalitions established four assessment and referral systems and eight resource directories for consumers and professionals covering 14 counties. Over 3,800 older adults were assessed for fall risk and more than 2,500 were referred to local services. Coalitions also trained over 2,800 service providers and educated more than 25,000 caregivers and older adults.

=== California Senior Fall Prevention Projects: Fall Prevention Program Expansion ===
Funded by the Archstone Foundation. From 2006–2009, six agencies that were providing direct services to older adults to reduce their risk of falling were supported to integrate additional fall prevention components to their programs, such as balance and mobility training, medical management, and environmental assessment and modification. FPCE provided technical assistance and evaluated their progress. Over the grant period, the Program Expansion Grantees provided fall prevention services for 450 older adults and educated 7,100 seniors and caregivers on fall risks and fall prevention.
