= Sustainable Slip Resistance =

Testing methodology

Sustainable Slip Resistance is a particular floor friction testing method and selection criteria for use in choosing and sourcing slip-resistant flooring that maintains good tribological characteristics over its life cycle to minimize slip and fall accidents. Testing floors before and after they are in place on a property can assure a building owner that safe flooring has been chosen and installed for its intended use. This floor slip resistance testing method, developed by the McDonald's Restaurant chain and now specified by many other property owners (e.g. Westfield, Aldi, Toyota) assesses the effects of mild abrasion on wet slip resistance. This test identifies flooring that has a high propensity to lose its wet slip resistance.

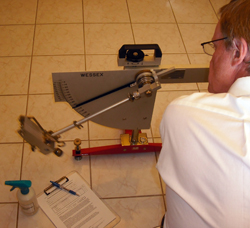
Pendulum floor friction tester in action

== The Need for Sustainable Slip Resistance ==
The widely accepted principle of safety by design, as well as U.S. laws and building codes, require that flooring be slip-resistant over its life cycle — not just at the time of installation. Safety criteria based solely on static coefficient of friction, often used in the U.S. for assessing safety, are too often misleading where flooring gets wet or otherwise lubricated in use.

Over 150 safety criteria have been adopted in Germany and Australia for specific situations — swimming pool decks, commercial kitchens, restrooms, etc. These are based on a laboratory test device, the variable-angle ramp, that is not readily portable. The pendulum tester is a portable ASTM method, has been used successfully since at least 1971 for assessing pedestrian traction potential, and is a national standard for pedestrian traction in 48 nations on four continents. Abrasion of a flooring sample, tested with the pendulum before and after, is being used to assess “Sustainable Slip Resistance.” Some architects and property owners are now combining this pendulum-based test with situation-specific safety criteria to specify and verify safe flooring. If flooring is in an area where it can get wet or otherwise lubricated (airborne deep-fryer fat, automobile grease, etc.), it needs to be slip-resistant under such conditions.

The Americans with Disabilities Act (ADA) requires that flooring accessible to disabled persons be slip resistant — not just when the building is constructed, but throughout its lifetime. Typical building codes in the USA require that "Every existing building, structure, premises or portion thereof shall be maintained in conformity with the code regulations and Department approvals in effect at the time of such construction and occupancy ... Every existing building, structure, or portion thereof shall be maintained in a safe condition and good repair … all physical elements of every existing building, structure or portion thereof shall be maintained … by restorative means, in a condition as close as reasonably feasible to their originally required and approved state."

If a building owner can be confident that his or her new flooring will sustain its slip resistance for a period of years this can protect a considerable investment in the flooring and prevent business interruptions as well as protect the safety of the pedestrian. The stakes are even higher for hotels and cruise ships, which are occupied virtually nonstop with guests who will not tolerate the noise involved in changing out hard flooring.

Sustainable Slip Resistance (SSR) testing was developed by Strautins in Australia for McDonald's Restaurants to identify flooring that is not highly susceptible to loss of its slip resistance from wear or some types of inappropriate maintenance. This test and appropriate selection criteria can help avoid investment in inappropriate flooring as well as prevent costly, life-altering accidents and increased healthcare costs. This article explains the method and how it can be used to improve flooring safety in the USA.

== Test Methods and Safety Criteria ==
=== International test methods ===
Germany and Australia have for over 10 years had detailed flooring slip resistance standards based on some 150 specific situations — e.g. external walkways, swimming pool decks, swimming pool stairs, commercial kitchens, hospital operating rooms, etc. Many architects elsewhere in Europe have informally adopted them. The slip resistance ratings are based on humans walking an oily or wet flooring sample in standard footwear and/or bare feet on a laboratory variable-angle ramp the repeatability of which was extensively documented. However, the test results apply only to flooring before it is installed. In some cases initially good wet slip resistance is gone after the building has been open for only a few weeks. The ramp test can't be used to assess safety of the flooring on site under the ambient conditions.

The United Kingdom has since 1971 had well-established slip resistance standards based on a portable test method, the pendulum. This test was developed for pedestrian traction by the U.S. National Bureau of Standards in the 1940s and further refined in the UK. It was validated for pedestrian traction in 1971, together with its safety standards, in the UK over a period of 25 years by 3500 real-world public walking area tests and site accident records. The test is an ASTM standard (E 303), slightly modified for pedestrian traction.

== SSR Test Procedure ==
The SSR test procedure consists of an initial wet pendulum test; abrasion, wet, for up to several thousand cycles with a standard (100x100 mm 3M green Scotchbrite) abrasive pad under a standard load of 1 kg at 50 cycles/min; and another wet pendulum test after abrasion. Both hard and soft rubber pendulum sliders (or “test feet”) might be used if the area is walked on in both hard-bottom footwear and bare feet or soft-soled footwear. The abrasion is conducted either manually or mechanically using a Gardco 12VFI linear washability and wear tester.

Typically, about 85 percent of the loss in slip resistance after 5000 cycles has already occurred after 500 cycles. Depending on the flooring buyer's situation, the flooring might be considered to have Sustainable Slip Resistance for a level floor if (for example) the wet Pendulum Test Value (PTV) is 35 or higher after abrasion for 500 cycles. The 500-cycle result in the laboratory has been found by in situ pendulum tests to be roughly equivalent to 6–12 months of wear in customer areas at a busy McDonald's Restaurant. The 500-cycle specification was adopted by McDonald's in Australia in October 2006. Other major property owners such as Aldi, Toyota, Westfield and a major cruise ship company have adopted similar specifications. In the US, flooring with SSR is available in ceramic tile, natural stone, and resilient products. Abrasive-containing coatings, some transparent, are also available that have SSR.

In some cases, analogous to the variable-angle ramp test-related standards mentioned above, the SSR safety standards are situation-specific rather than “one size fits all.” Thus a minimum pre-abrasion wet PTV of 35 might be required for hotel or hospital bathroom floors; a minimum of 45 (hard rubber slider) for stair nosings that get wet in use; and 54 (hard slider) for commercial kitchens and steep outdoor ramps. If the flooring is to be sealed after installation, the laboratory tests should be conducted with the correct sealer applied. Cleanability tests with expected contaminants (local mud, coffee, red wine, ketchup, etc.) by owners and/or other duty holders are also advisable before final selection of flooring. The methods of cleaning should be planned. (A dirty mop with dirty water might not be adequate for slip resistant flooring, but abrasive pads can destroy wet slip resistance quickly.)
