= Floor slip resistance testing =

Testing of floors for slip-resistance relating to slip-and-fall hazards

Floor slip resistance testing is the science of measuring the coefficient of friction (or resistance to slip accidents) of flooring surfaces, either in a laboratory (before or after installation) or on floors in situ. Slip resistance testing (or floor friction testing) is usually desired by the building's owner or manager when there has been a report of a slip and fall accident, when there has been a report of a near accident, or (preferably) before the flooring is installed on the property. Flooring is tested using a tribometer (floor slip resistance tester) to discover if there is a high propensity for slip and fall accidents on it, dry or (most often) when wet with water or lubricated with other contaminants such as kitchen grease, hydraulic oil, etc. There have been numerous floor slip-resistance testing tribometers and lab devices produced around the world to measure both the static (stationary) and dynamic (in motion) coefficient of friction, but only a few have proven to be reliable for obtaining useful safety results and have current official test methods. Static coefficient of friction (SCOF) testing has always been unreliable for assessing safety in the wet condition, so any reliable slip resistance test will be measuring the available slip resistance to someone who is moving (dynamic) across the floor, and therefore will be assessing dynamic coefficient of friction (DCOF). If an instrument has no official published test method, or has a withdrawn (or historical) test method, then there is a problem with the instrument, often being poor precision.

To assess a floor's slip resistance, a reliable, thoroughly researched (in interlaboratory studies) floor friction test method must be used, and then a minimum safety criterion (0.42, 0.60, 36, etc.) is needed to apply to the results. Each different slip test device will have its own safety criterion. If the floor is likely to be lubricated with water or grease in use, it needs to be anti-slip under these expected conditions. Floor slip resistance testing can be carried out dry or wet with water. Dry slip resistance is not an indicator of wet slip resistance—in fact the two often vary inversely—so reliable wet slip resistance testing is often needed as well as reliable dry testing.

== Test methods and safety criteria ==
=== Pendulum slip resistance tester ===
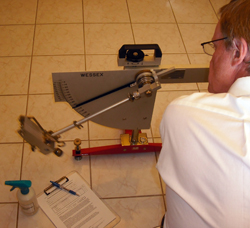
Pendulum floor slip resistance tester

The ASTM E303-22 (United States), BS EN 16165:2021, BS EN 13036-4:2011 (United Kingdom and many other European nations), AS 4663:2013—Slip resistance of existing pedestrian surfaces, and AS 4586:2013—Slip resistance classification of new pedestrian surface materials (Australia/New Zealand) slip resistance test standards define the pendulum tester that is now a national standard for pedestrian slip resistance in at least 50 nations on five continents and has been endorsed by Ceramic Tile Institute of America since 2001. It is the most widely used pedestrian slip resistance test method worldwide. It has passed the ASTM F2508 in published studies (see BOT-3000E section for more information on F2508). The pendulum uses a standardized piece of rubber (Four S rubber, also known as Slider 96, or "Standard Shoe Sole Simulating" rubber), which is set up to travel across the flooring sample for 123–125 mm, mounted onto the pendulum foot. When the arm of the pendulum is set up to miss the flooring completely, the arm swings up to parallel from where it started, and the pointer (brought along by the arm holding the rubber slider) reads zero. Slippery flooring produces readings close to zero, and flooring with higher resistance to slipping gives results further from zero—high numbers (such as those 36 and above) indicating suitably slip-resistant flooring.

The United Kingdom has since 1971 had well-established slip resistance standards based on the pendulum, or British Pendulum as it is sometimes called. This test was developed for pedestrian traction by the U.S. National Bureau of Standards in the 1940s and further refined in the U.K. It was validated for pedestrian traction in 1971, together with its safety standards, in the U.K. over 25 years by 3500 real-world public walking area tests and site accident records. The test is an ASTM standard (ASTM E303-22), which in 2022 was updated to describe testing for floors, as well as skid resistance testing for roads. The usual safety standard for a level floor is a minimum Pendulum Test Value (PTV) of 36. The pendulum is also the instrument used in the Sustainable Slip Resistance test method, which measures the possible impact of years of use on a potential flooring's slip resistance. The pendulum is also used in the U.S. and elsewhere for determining the slipperiness of airport runways and basketball courts with other ASTM standards.

Standards Australia HB 197:1999 as well as Standards Australia HB 198:2014 give detailed recommendations/guidelines of minimum wet Pendulum Test Slip Resistance Values for many different situations in AS 4586-2013: e.g. external ramps, 54; external walkways and pedestrian crossings, 45; shopping center food courts, 35; and elevator lobbies above external entry level may be 25 or less. There are also barefoot area recommendations based on pendulum tests with a soft rubber slider.

=== BOT-3000E Digital slip tester ===
America's ANSI A326.3 test standard is for use of a digital tribometer called the BOT-3000E, which measures dynamic friction at a lower speed than the pendulum.

The ANSI A137.1 slip resistance test method preceded ANSI A326.3 and was essentially the same test method. In 2021, ANSI A326.3 was updated to give additional MINIMUM DCOF values for barefoot areas, inclined floors, and outdoor flooring, but many other factors must be considered, according to the test method; disclaimers within the test method clearly state the minimum DCOF numbers given do not indicate a floor will be considered "safe" when the minimum is met. One of the many disclaimers added to the latest version of the test method states that “the measured DCOF value shall not be the only factor in determining the appropriateness of a hard surface flooring material for a particular application.” This means that A326.3 should not be used to assess real-world slip risk, but is rather a useful test method to assess changes in slip resistance due to wear, maintenance practices, and other factors.

=== Variable-angle ramp ===
The Variable-Angle Ramp is a German-developed method for obtaining pedestrian slip resistance values. Flooring samples are mounted horizontally on the ramp tester and an operator clad in safety boots or bare feet performs a standardized walk up and down the sample while wearing a harness to stop the operator from being injured. The sample is slowly inclined until the operator slips on the surface. The angle at which the subject slips is then recorded. Two operators repeat this test three times and then an average is calculated. The repeatability of this test method was extensively documented. Tests can be performed dry, wet with soapy water and bare feet, wet with oil, etc.

Over 150 safety criteria have been adopted in Germany and Australia for specific situations — swimming pool decks, commercial kitchens, restrooms, etc. based on the variable-angle ramp, but the ramp itself is not readily portable, so this instrument is only for lab testing and is therefore quite limited in its utility.
