= Qualitative Health Research =

- Discipline: Public health
- Language: English
- Edited by: Janice M. Morse

Publication details
- History: 1991–present
- Publisher: SAGE Publishing
- Frequency: Monthly
- Impact factor: 2.6 (2023)

Standard abbreviations
- ISO 4: Qual. Health Res.

Indexing
- CODEN: QHREEM
- ISSN: 1049-7323 (print); 1552-7557 (web)
- LCCN: 91658581
- OCLC no.: 270641339

Links
- Journal homepage; Online access; Online archive

Qualitative Health Research is a peer-reviewed medical journal that covers the field of public health. The editor-in-chief is Janice M. Morse (University of Utah). It was established in 1991 and is published by SAGE Publishing.

== Abstracting and indexing ==
The journal is abstracted and indexed in Scopus and the Science Citation Index Expanded. According to the Journal Citation Reports, its 2023 impact factor is 2.6.
