= Hip protector =

Padded clothing

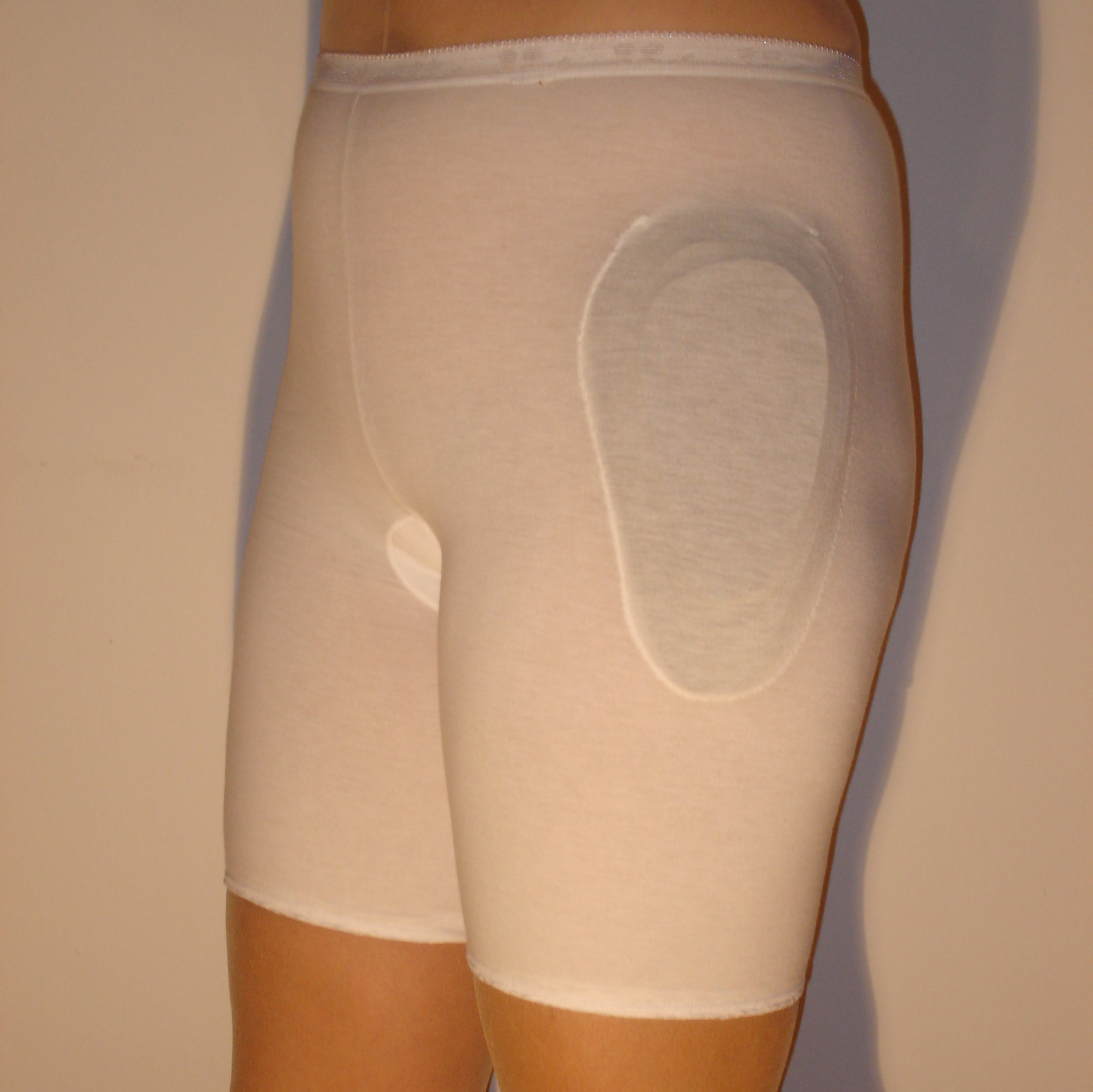
AHIP Protector

A hip protector is a specialized form of pants or underwear containing pads (either hard or soft) along the outside of each hip/leg, designed to prevent hip fractures following a fall. Recent developments include the use of double-sided adhesive films that are breathable and more comfortable to wear than specialised pants. The adhesive films are safer because they can be worn in the bath or shower, or when toileting. Hip protectors are most commonly used in elderly individuals who have a high risk of falls and hip fractures (for example, due to history of a previous fall and underlying osteoporosis).

Most hip fractures follow an impact due to a lateral fall. The pads are located over the trochanters, the bony extrusions of the hip region.

== Effectiveness ==
A 2014 Cochrane review found that hip protectors decrease the number of hip fractures among the elderly.

A number of reviews have found that hip protectors are cost-effective, particularly among residents of care homes and for long-stay patients in hospital.

A previous review found that the effect for preventing hip fracture among nursing home residents was small and not effective among community dwelling elderly individuals. A 2007 review found a decreased risk of hip fractures in elderly nursing home residents.

However, acceptance and long-term compliance towards them has historically been quite low, mainly because of discomfort, dislike of their appearance by the person wearing it, and disagreement about fracture risk. More modern hip protectors do not suffer from these disadvantages because they are slimmer with a low profile, so less noticeable, have ventilation holes and ducting to keep the skin cool under the pad and are soft and pliable conforming to the contours of the hip. Better independent testing procedures developed by Professor Julian Minns have established a reliable baseline for impact absorption performance.

Research which has found hip protectors to be beneficial found hard, energy-shunting hip protectors to be superior to soft, energy-absorbing ones. However this research predates the introduction of hip protector pads in 2011/2012 using modern non-Newtonian materials, such as D3o that absorb around 75% of the impact, typically twice that of previous devices that used soft materials such as textiles or foam pads in an airtight bag, but comparable to the best of the energy-shunting devices, which have now largely disappeared from the market because of a slight tendency to cause pelvic fractures when the energy is transferred Another study showed that hip protectors' design and mechanical properties vary drastically among commercially available hip protectors.

== Types ==
Hip protectors are either of the "crash helmet type" or "energy-absorbing type". The "crash helmet type" distributes impacts into the surrounding soft tissue, while the "energy-absorbing type" is made of a compressible material and diminishes the force of impact. Both of these systems aim to reduce the focused force beneath an estimated fracture threshold. Several different commercially available hip protectors exist.
