= Morse Fall Scale =

Method to assess a patient's likelihood of falling

- Purpose: assess individuals risk of fall

The Morse Fall Scale (MFS) is a rapid and simple method of assessing a patient’s likelihood of falling. A large majority of nurses (82.9%) rate the scale as “quick and easy to use,” and 54% estimated that it took less than 3 minutes to rate a patient. "The scale consists of six items reflecting risk factors of falling such as: (i) history of falling, (ii) secondary diagnosis, (iii) ambulatory aids, (iv) intravenous therapy, (v) type of gait and (vi) mental status", and it has been shown to have predictive validity and interrater reliability. The MFS is used widely in acute care settings, both in the hospital and long-term care inpatient settings. The manual for using the MFS is: Preventing Patient Falls (Morse, JM., Springer, 2008).
