= Neon sign =

Electrified, luminous tube lights

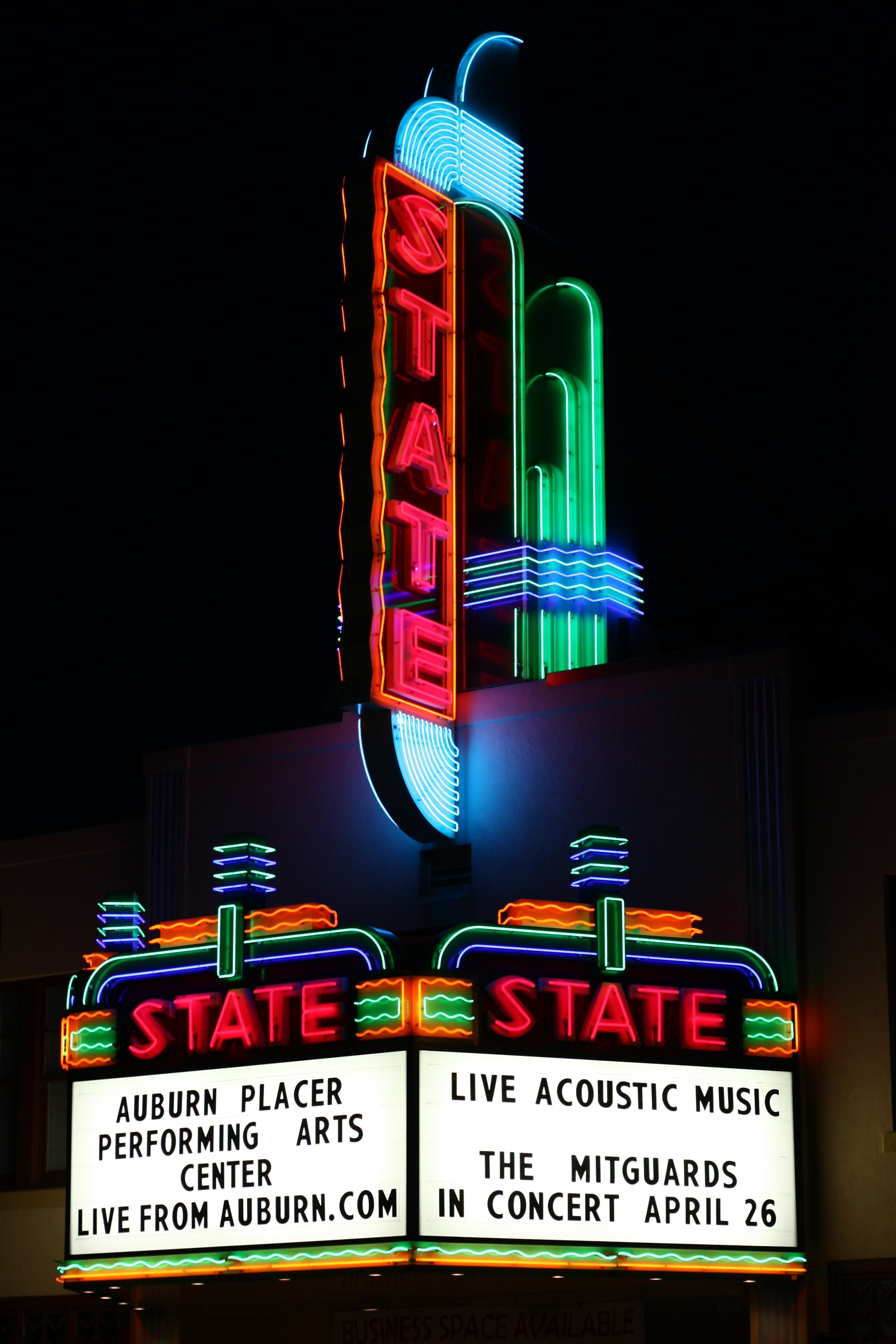
1936 neon marquee sign for a theater in Auburn, California, as rebuilt in 2006

In the signage industry, neon signs are electric signs lighted by long luminous gas-discharge tubes that contain rarefied neon or other gases. They are the most common use for neon lighting, which was first demonstrated in a modern form in December 1910 by Georges Claude at the Paris Motor Show.

While they are used worldwide, neon signs were popular in the United States from about the 1920s to 1950s. The installations in Times Square, many originally designed by Douglas Leigh, were famed, and there were nearly 2,000 small shops producing neon signs by 1940. In addition to signage, neon lighting is used frequently by artists and architects, and (in a modified form) in plasma display panels and televisions. The signage industry has declined in the past several decades, and cities are now concerned with preserving and restoring their antique neon signs.

Light emitting diode arrays can be formed and covered with a light diffuser to simulate the appearance of neon lamps.

When actual neon is used, the result is a distinct reddish-orange glow. Other colors require different gases and techniques, and thus are not true "neon" signs by a strict definition. Nonetheless, the term "neon sign" remains in use even when using these other gases.

== History ==
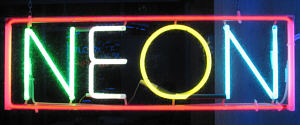
Neon sign

The neon sign is an evolution of the earlier Geissler tube, which is a sealed glass tube containing a "rarefied" gas (the gas pressure in the tube is well below atmospheric pressure). When a voltage is applied to electrodes inserted through the glass, an electrical glow discharge results. Geissler tubes were popular in the late 19th century, and the different colors they emitted were characteristics of the gases within. They were unsuitable for general lighting, as the pressure of the gas inside typically declined with use. The direct predecessor of neon tube lighting was the Moore tube, which used nitrogen or carbon dioxide as the luminous gas and a patented mechanism for maintaining pressure. Moore tubes were sold for commercial lighting for a number of years in the early 1900s.

The discovery of neon in 1898 by British scientists William Ramsay and Morris W. Travers included the observation of a brilliant red glow in Geissler tubes. Travers wrote, "the blaze of crimson light from the tube told its own story and was a sight to dwell upon and never forget." Following neon's discovery, neon tubes were used as scientific instruments and novelties. A sign created by Perley G. Nutting and displaying the word "neon" may have been shown at the Louisiana Purchase Exposition of 1904, although this claim has been disputed; in any event, the scarcity of neon would have precluded the development of a lighting product. After 1902, Georges Claude's company in France, Air Liquide, began producing industrial quantities of neon, essentially as a byproduct of their air liquefaction business. From December 3–18, 1910, Claude demonstrated two 12-metre (39 ft) long bright red neon tubes at the Paris Motor Show. This demonstration lit a peristyle of the Grand Palais (a large exhibition hall). Claude's associate, Jacques Fonsèque, realized the possibilities for a business based on signage and advertising. By 1913 a large sign for the vermouth Cinzano illuminated the night sky in Paris, and by 1919 the entrance to the Paris Opera was adorned with neon tube lighting. Over the next several years, patents were granted to Claude for two innovations still used today: a "bombardment" technique to remove impurities from the working gas of a sealed sign, and a design for the internal electrodes of the sign that prevented their degradation by sputtering.

In 1923, Georges Claude and his French company Claude Neon introduced neon gas signs to the United States by selling two to a Packard car dealership in Los Angeles. Earle C. Anthony purchased the two signs reading "Packard" for $1,250 apiece. Neon lighting quickly became a popular fixture in outdoor advertising. The signs – dubbed "liquid fire" – were visible in daylight; people would stop and stare. What may be the oldest surviving neon sign in the United States, still in use for its original purpose, is the sign "Theatre" (1929) at the Lake Worth Playhouse in Lake Worth Beach, Florida.

The next major technological innovation in neon lighting and signs was the development of fluorescent tube coatings. Jacques Risler received a French patent in 1926 for these. Neon signs that use an argon/mercury gas mixture emit a good deal of ultraviolet light. When this light is absorbed by a fluorescent coating, preferably inside the tube, the coating (called a "phosphor") glows with its own color. While only a few colors were initially available to sign designers, after the Second World War, phosphor materials were researched intensively for use in color televisions. About two dozen colors were available to neon sign designers by the 1960s, and today there are nearly 100 available colors.

Suddenly we were in down-town Seattle and lights were exploding around me like skyrockets on the Fourth of July. Red lights, blue lights, yellow lights, green, purple, white, orange, punctured the night in a million places and tore the black satin pavement to shreds. I hadn't seen neon lights before. They had been invented, or at least put in common use, while I was up in the mountains and in that short time the whole aspect of the world had changed. In place of dumpy little bulbs sputteringly spelling out Café or Theatre, there were long swooping spirals of pure brilliant colour. A waiter outlined in bright red with a blazing white napkin over his arm flashed on and off over a large Café. Puget Sound Power and Light Company cut through the rain and darkness, bright blue and cheery. Cafês, theatres, cigar stores, stationery stores, real estate offices with their names spelled out in molten colour, welcomed me to the city.

— Betty MacDonald, recalling 1931, Anybody Can Do Anything

During the late 2000s, a survey conducted by the trade magazine Signs of the Times showed that the use of neon signs in the United States experienced a significant decline. In 2007, neon signs accounted for 33% of illuminated signage, while LEDs made up 23%. By 2010, this trend had reversed, with LEDs increasing to 40% and neon falling to just 18%. In recent years, even cities known for their vibrant neon-lit streets, such as Hong Kong, have increasingly transitioned to LED technology.

== Fabrication ==
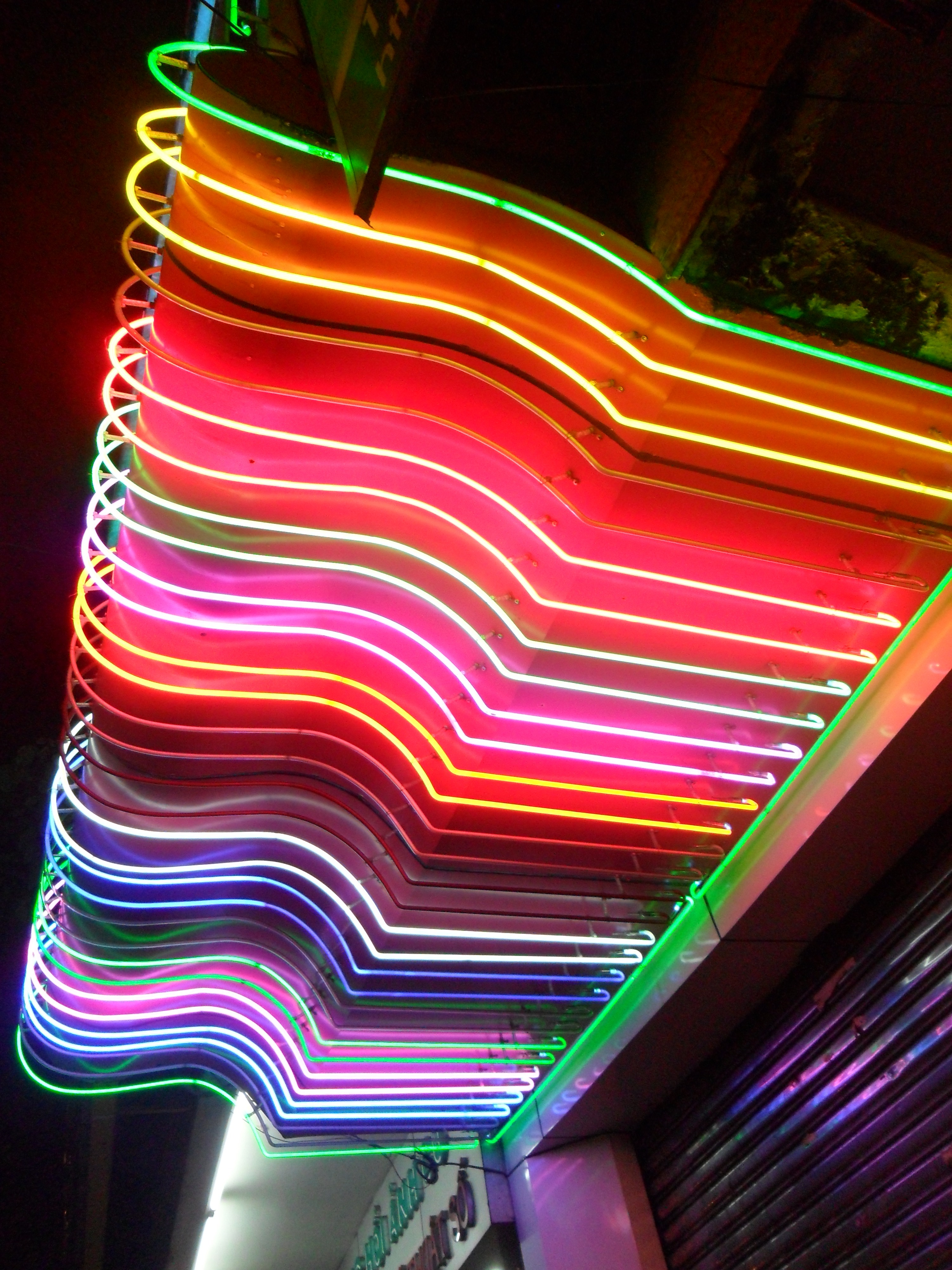
An enormous number of colors can be created by combinations of different gases and fluorescent coatings in the tube.

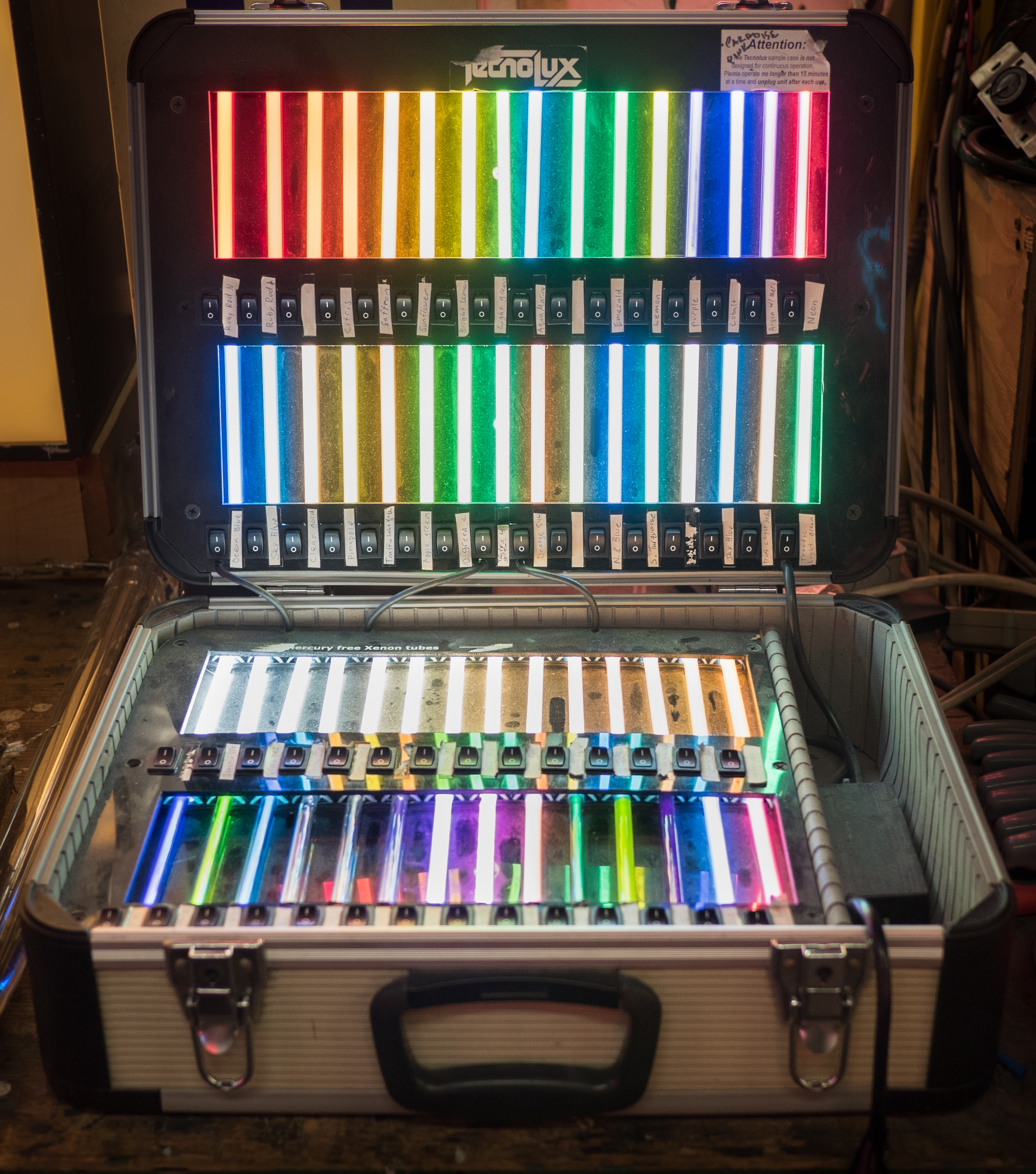
A neon sample display case in a glass studio

Neon tube signs are produced by bending glass tubing into shapes for the sign. After shaping, the hollow tube is evacuated with vacuum pumps and filled with gases to produce the desired color, e.g. neon gas for red lighting. Electrodes are placed at each end of the shaped tubing and the entire tube is sealed to prevent gases from leaking in or out which leads to tube failure.

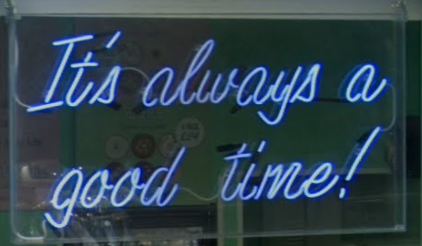
Blue neon sign in a pastry shop

== Applications ==
Light-emitting tubes form colored lines with which a text can be written or a picture drawn, including various decorations, especially in advertising and commercial signage. By programming sequences of switching parts on and off, there are many possibilities for dynamic light patterns that form animated images.

In some applications, neon tubes are increasingly being replaced with LEDs, given the steady advance in LED luminosity and decreasing cost of high-brightness LEDs. However, proponents of neon technology maintain that they still have significant advantages over LEDs.

Neon illumination is valuable to invoke the 1940s or 1950s nostalgia in marketing and in the historic restoration of architectural landmarks from the neon era. Architecture in the streamline moderne era often deployed neon to accent structural pigmented glass built into the façade of a 1930s or 1940s structure; many of these buildings now qualify for inclusion on historic registers such as the U.S. National Register of Historic Places if their historic integrity is faithfully maintained. In the latter half of the 20th century, neon signs found a distinct place in artistic installations and nightlife districts, particularly during the 1980s and 1990s, when they became symbols of vibrant, modern design. Today, neon signs continue to be used for their nostalgic aesthetic appeal and unique lighting effects, often seen in boutique branding, interior decoration, and public art.

== Gallery ==
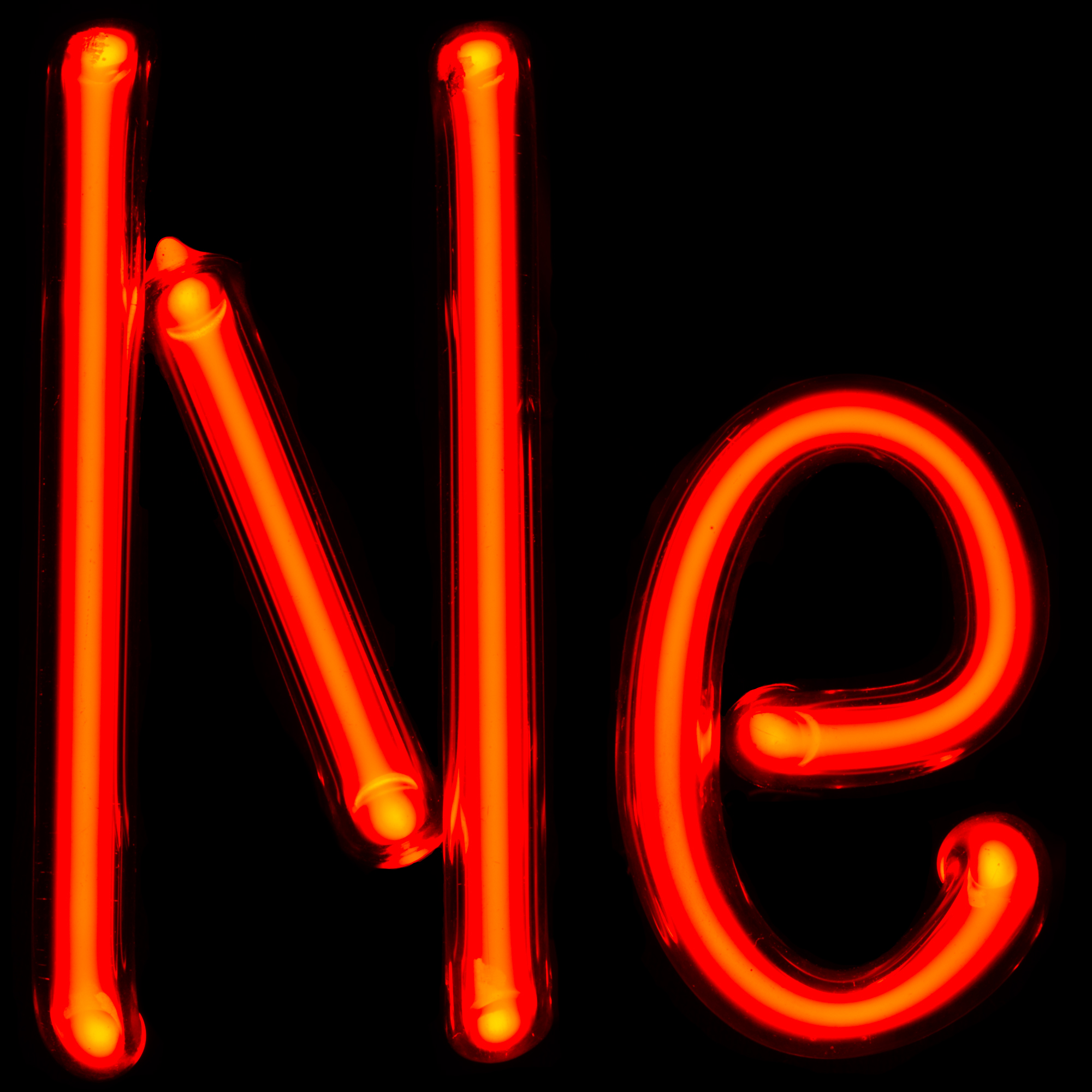
Neon

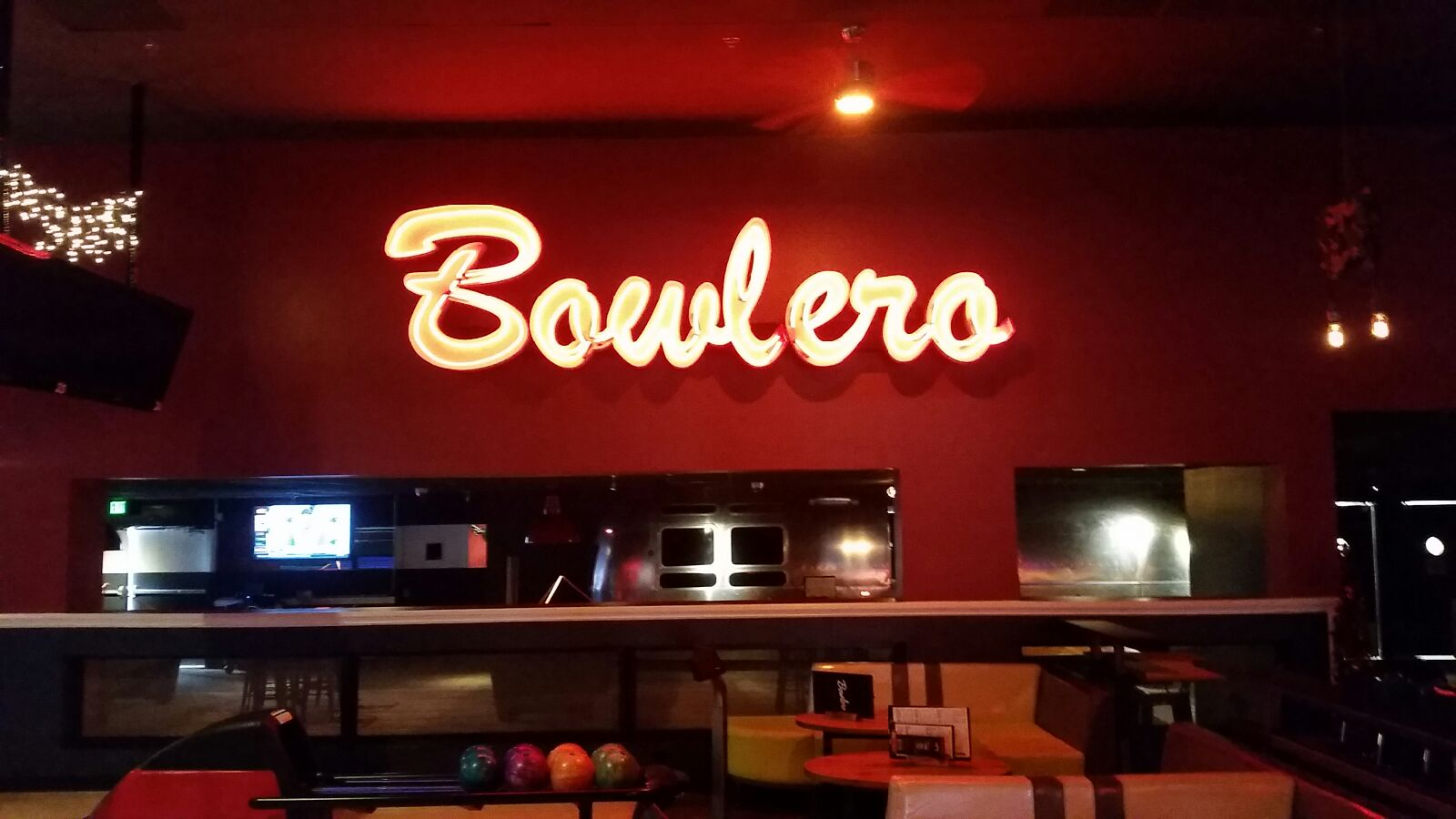
Neon bowling alley sign

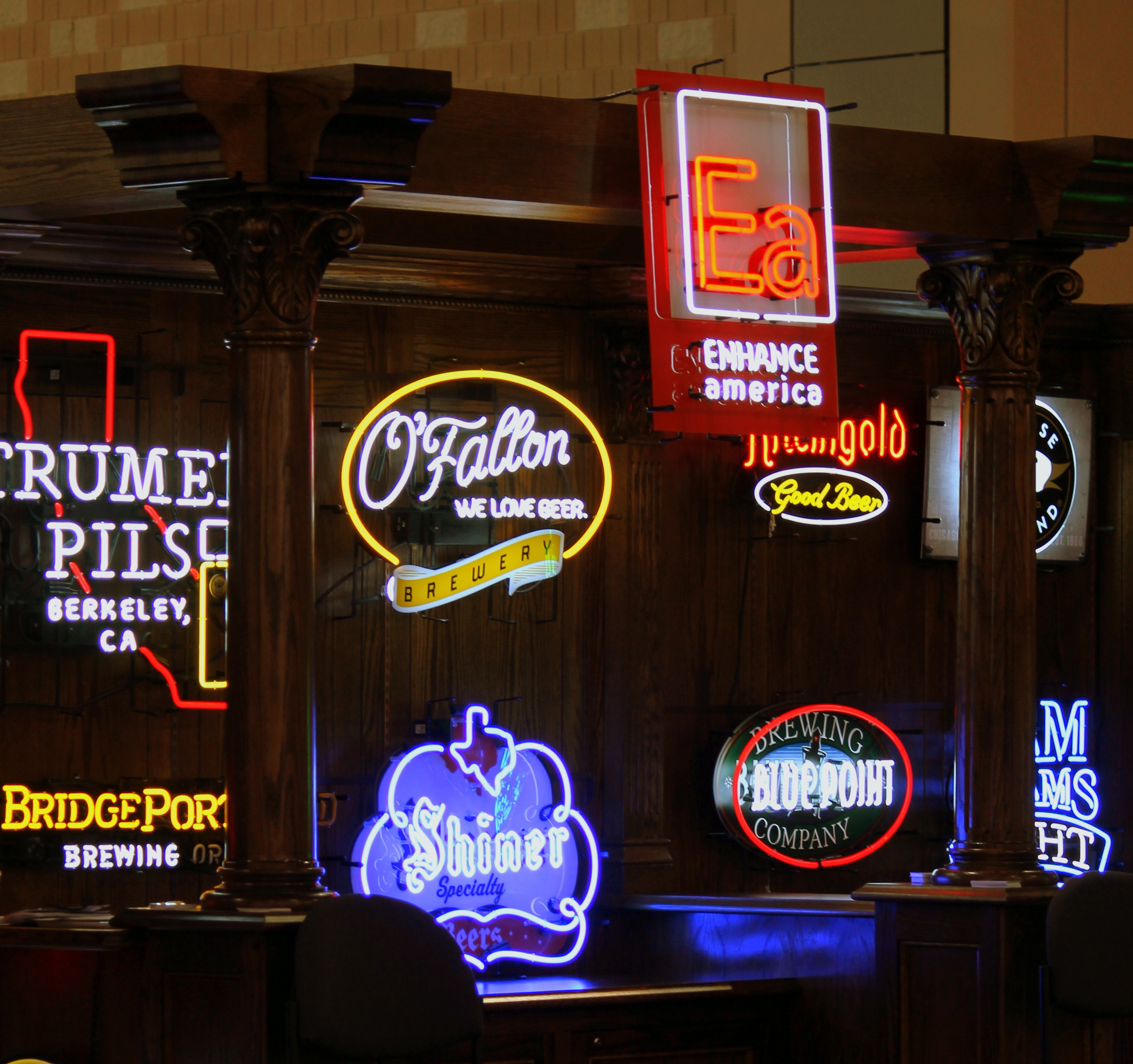
Promotional signage neon

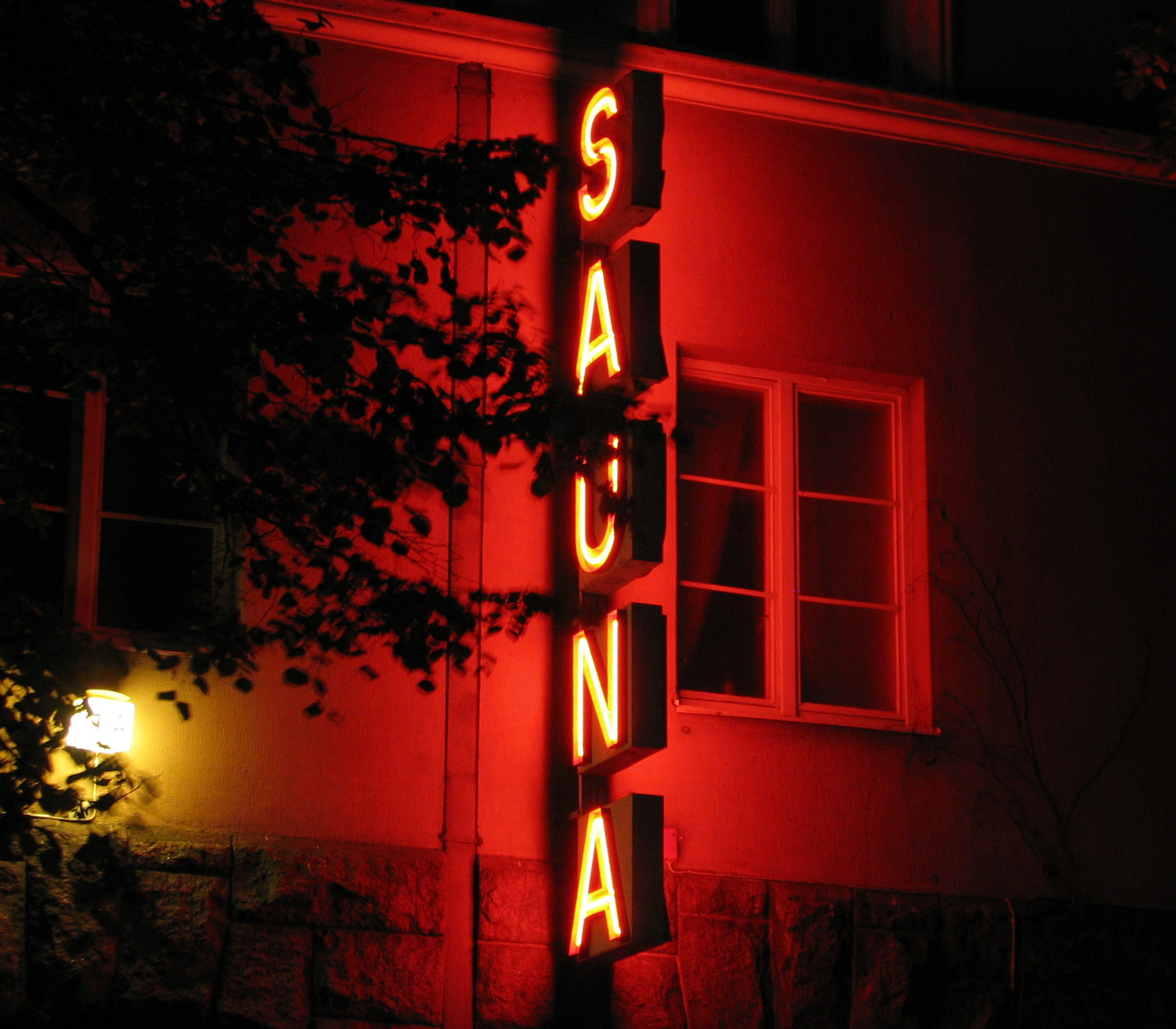
Neon sign of a public sauna in Helsinki

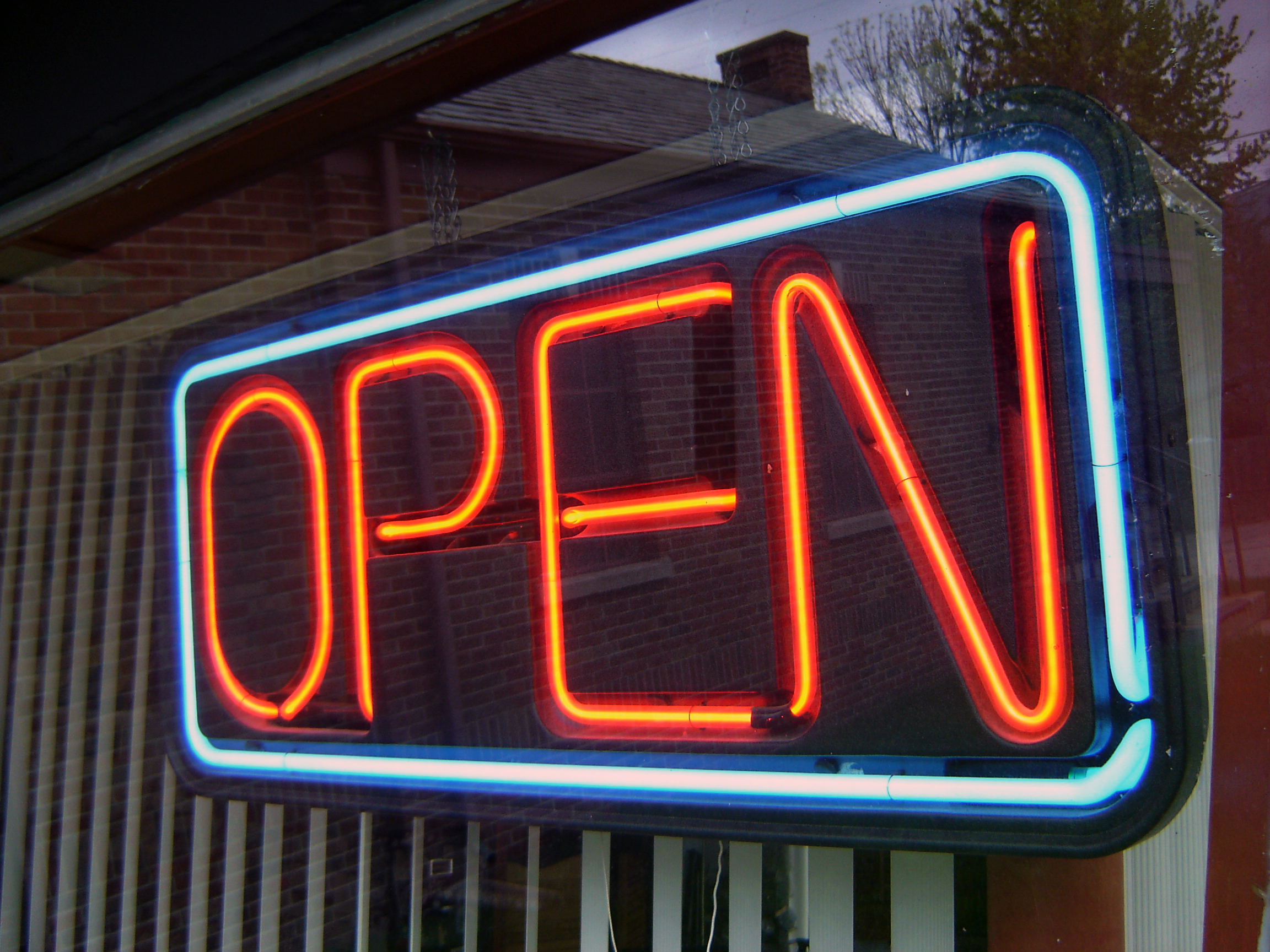
A neon "OPEN" sign, popular among U.S. businesses since the mid-1980s.

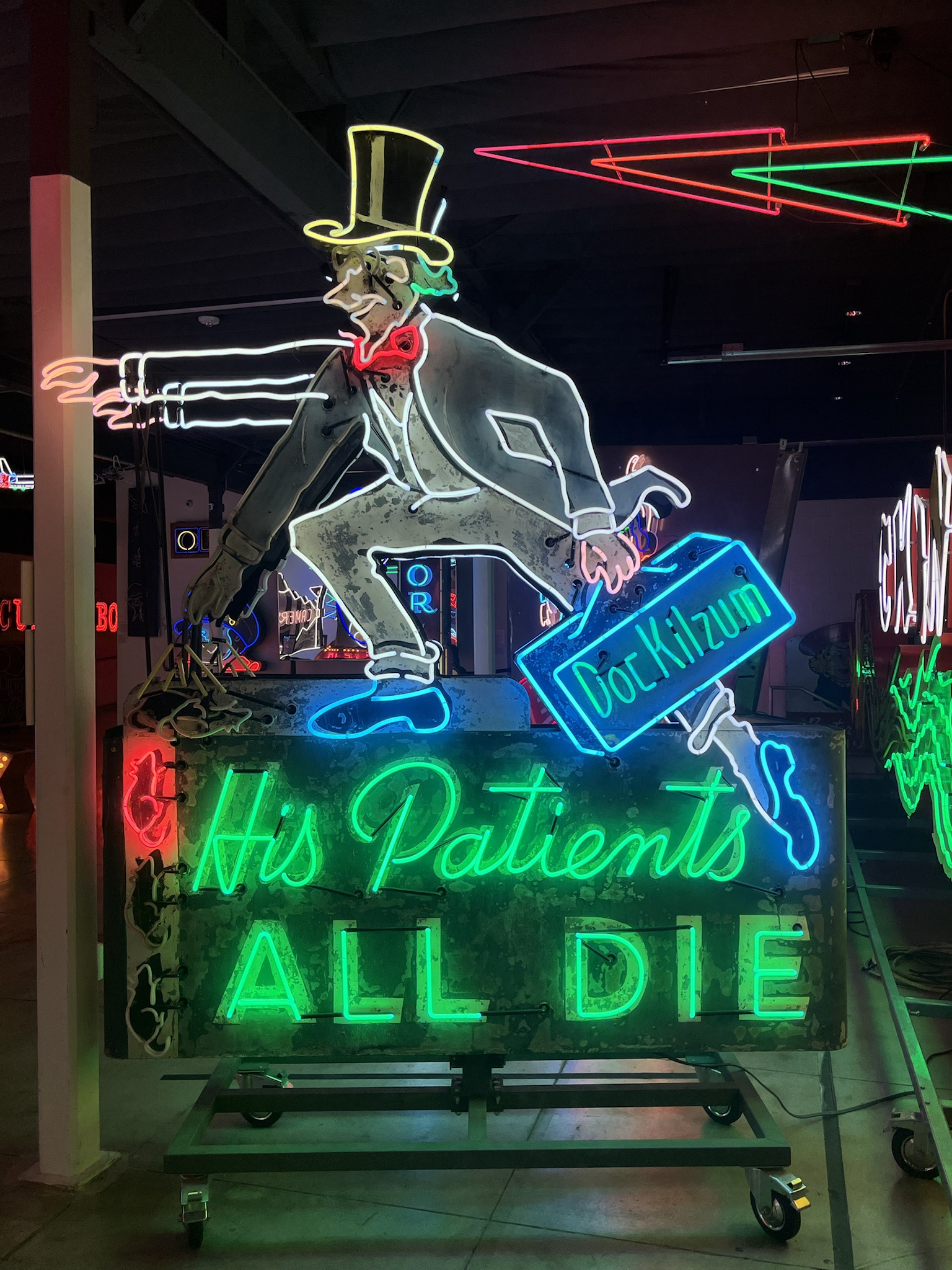
Doc Kilzum animated neon sign from Paramount Pest Control in Los Angeles (1940s)

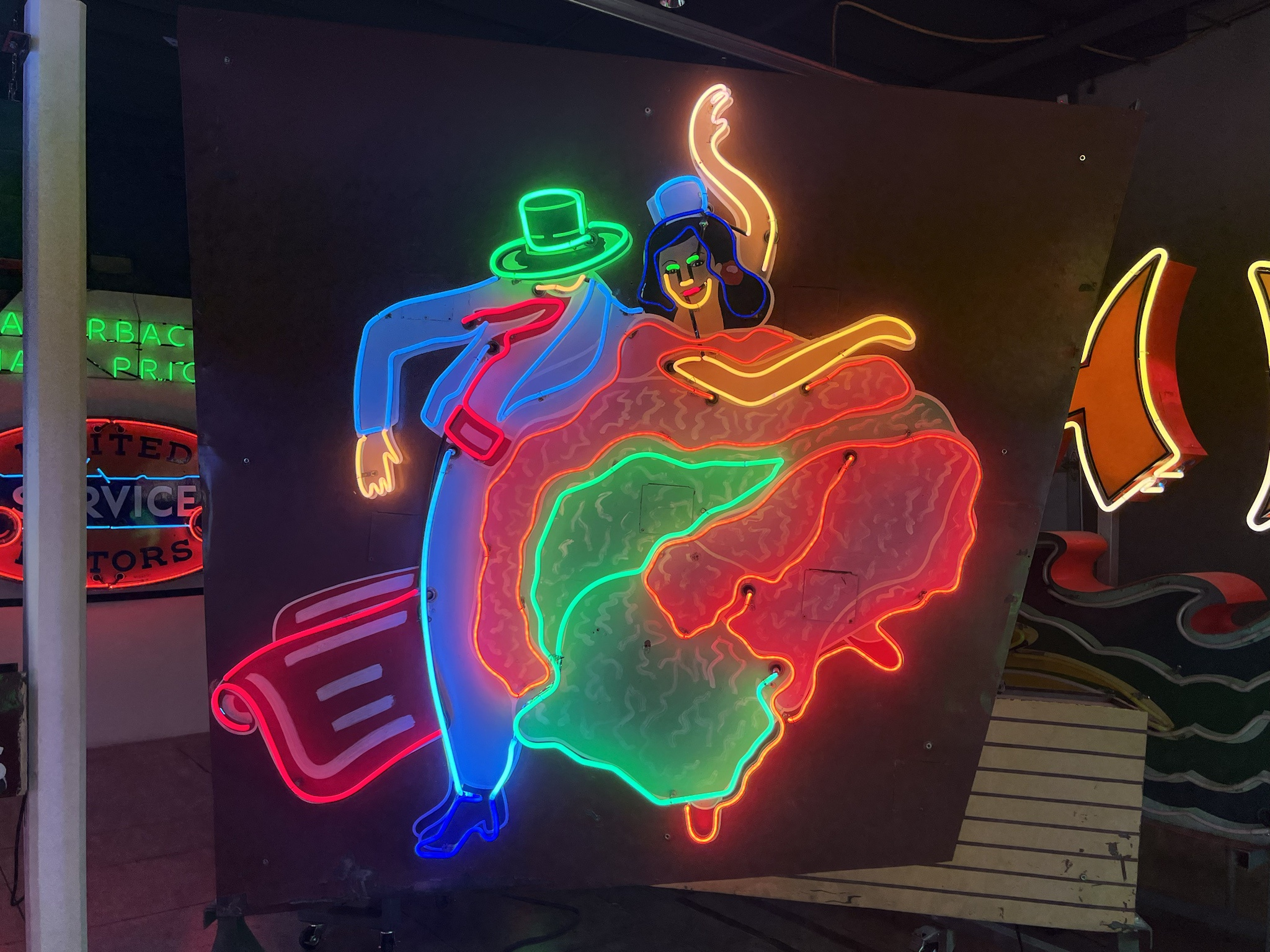
Neon sign from La Fonda Mexican restaurant in Glendale, California (1940s)

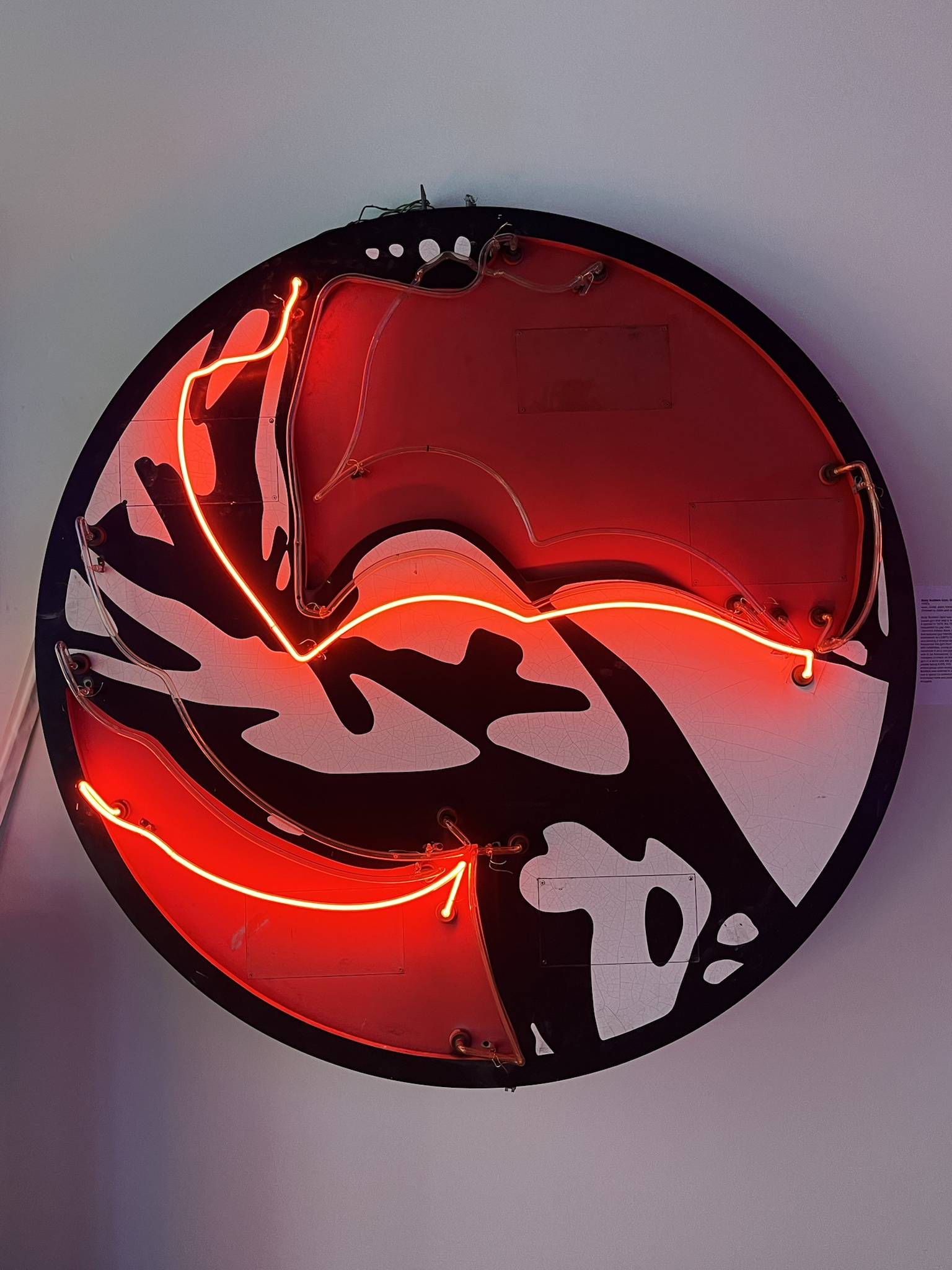
Animated sign from Body Builders Gym in Los Angeles (1970s)

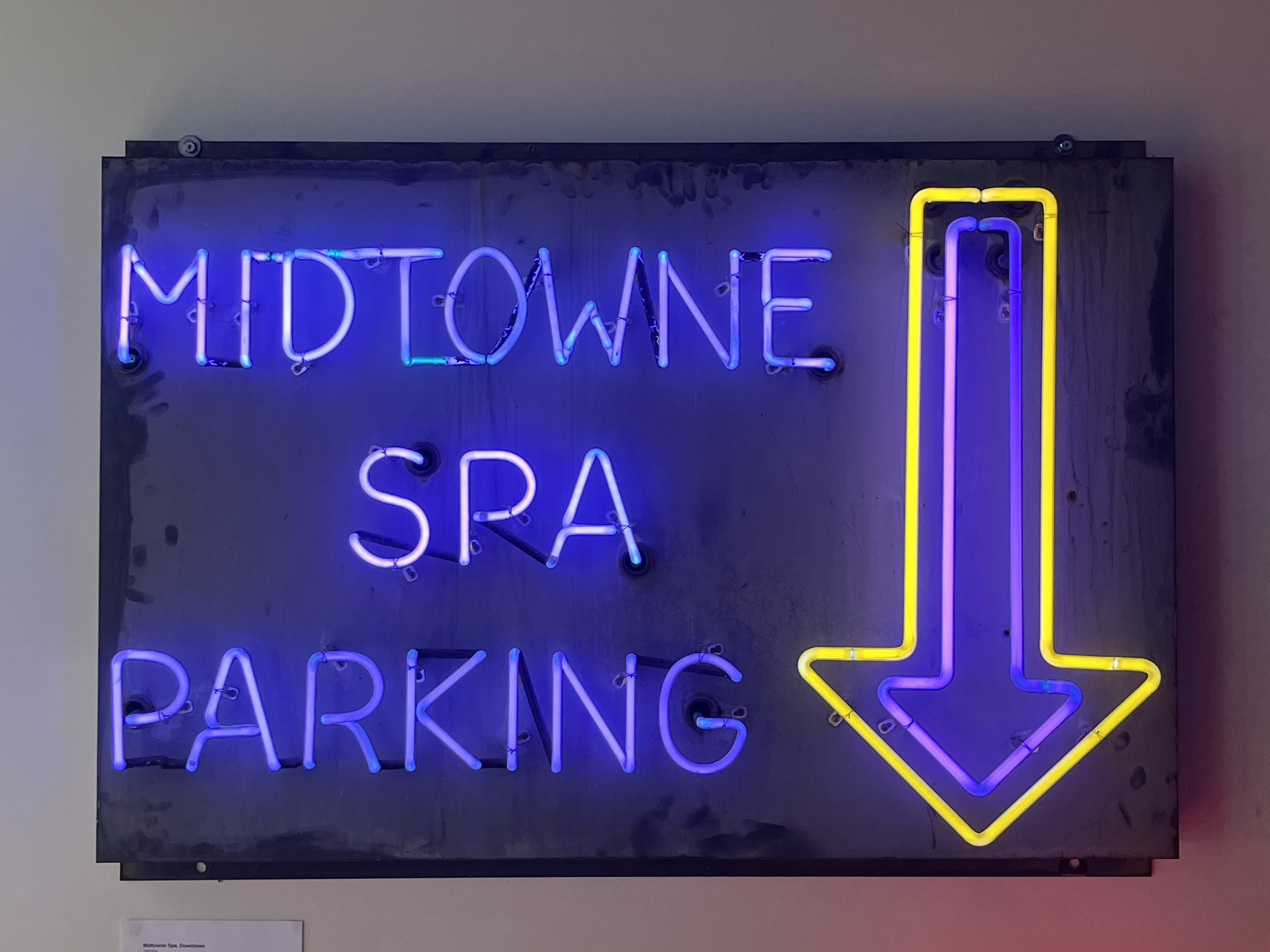
Neon sign from Midtowne Spa in Los Angeles (1970s)

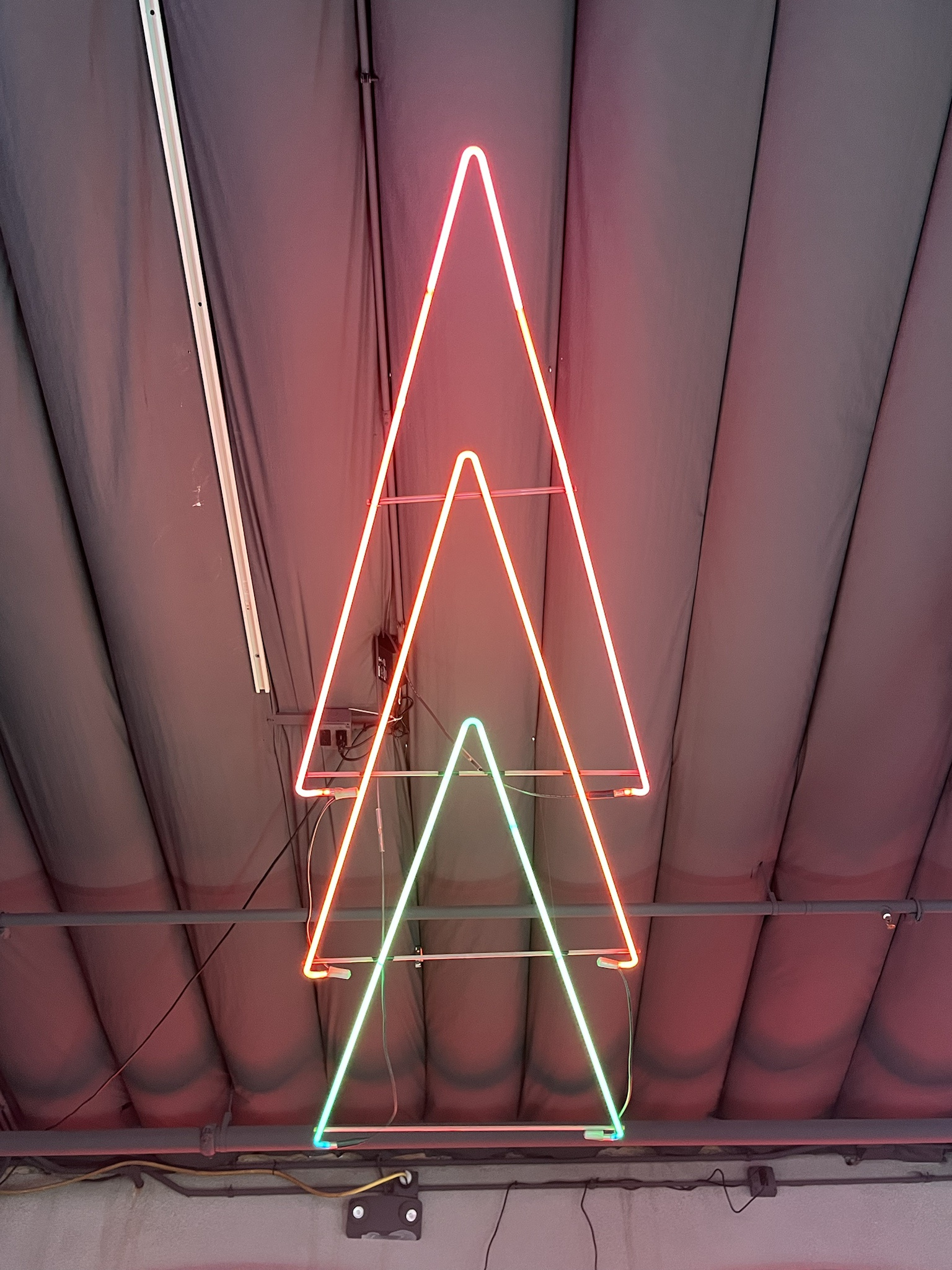
Architectural neon art from Man's Country (1970s)

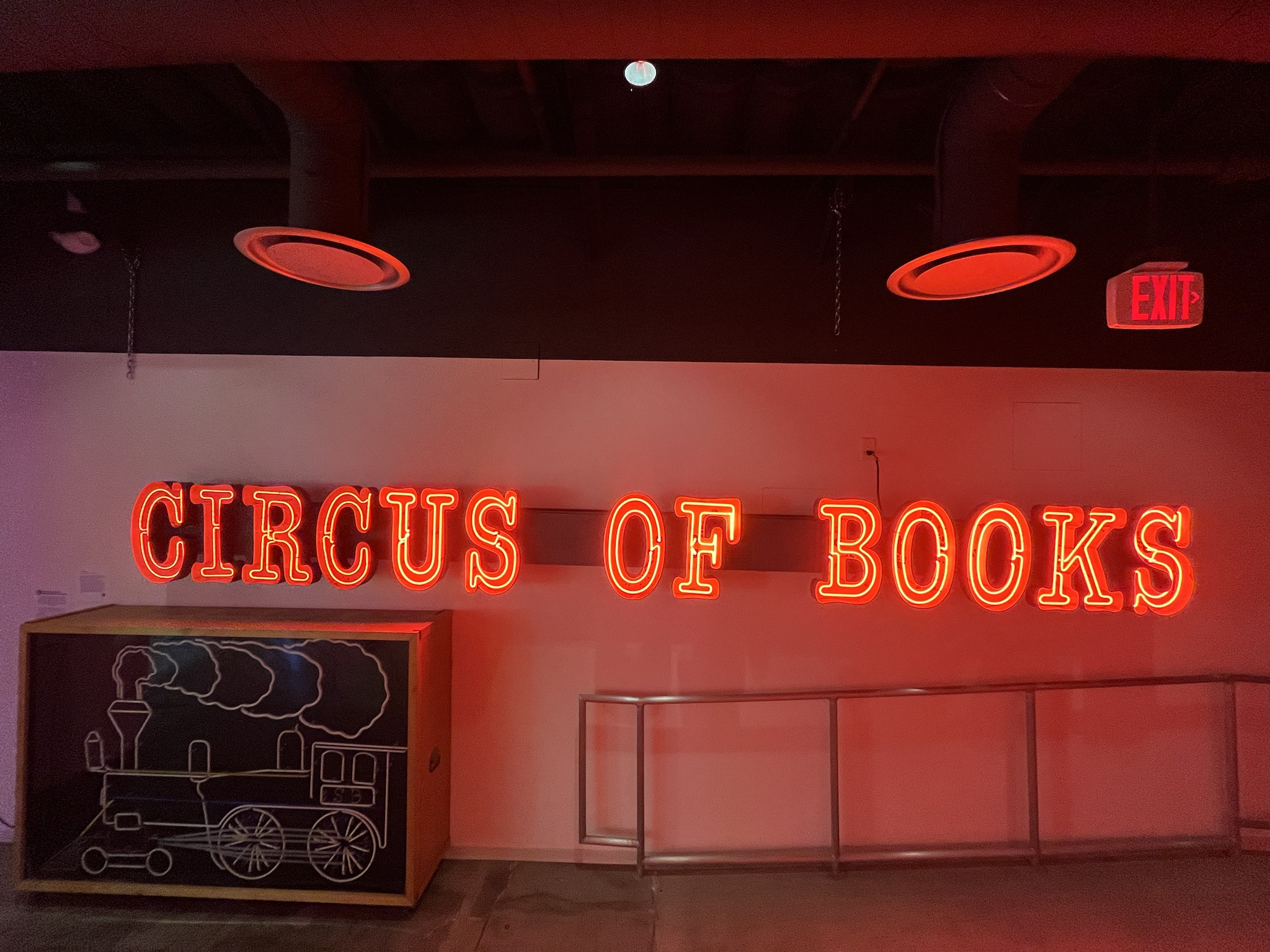
Sign from Circus of Books in West Hollywood, California (1980s)

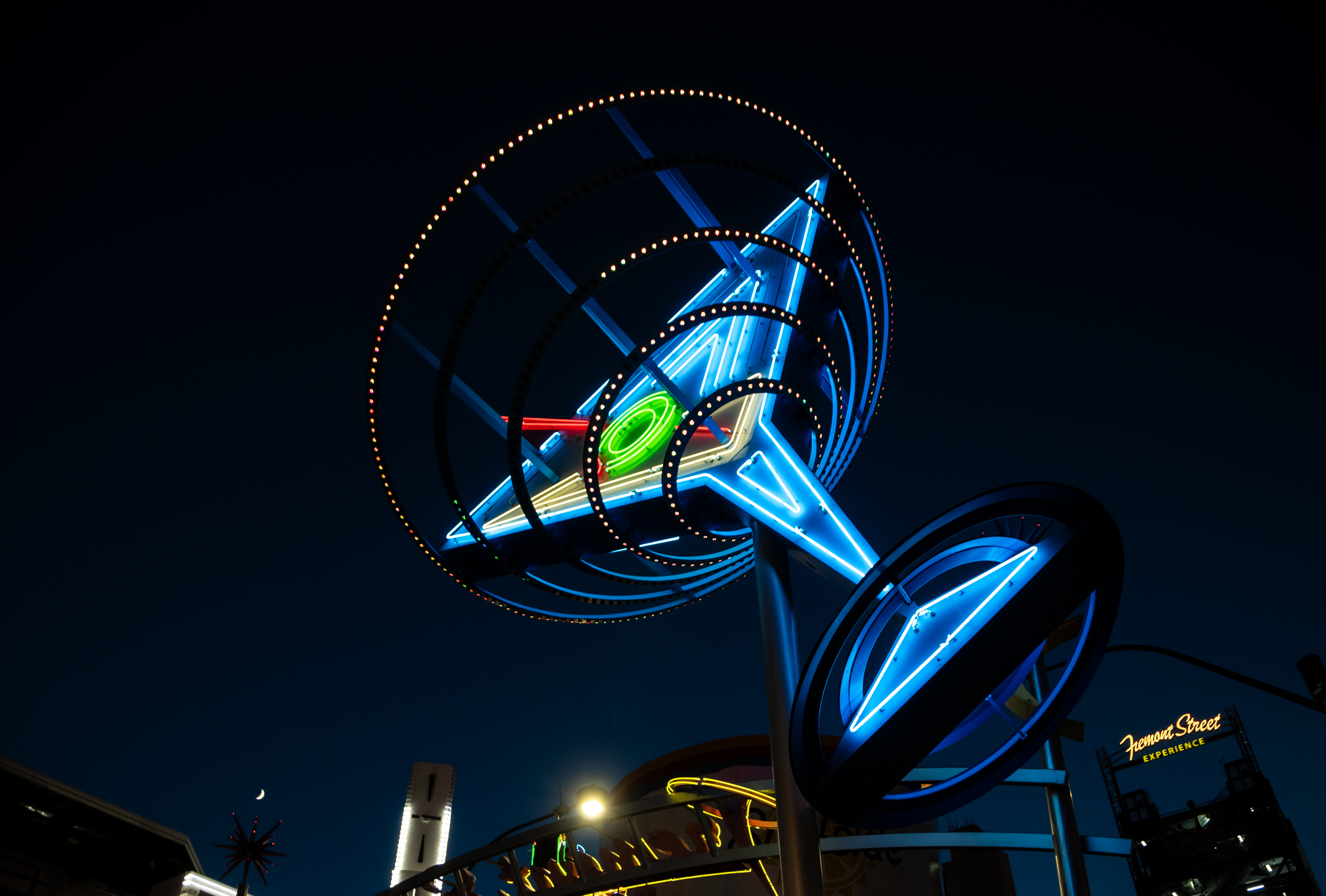
Oscar's Martini on Fremont Street, Las Vegas, 2025

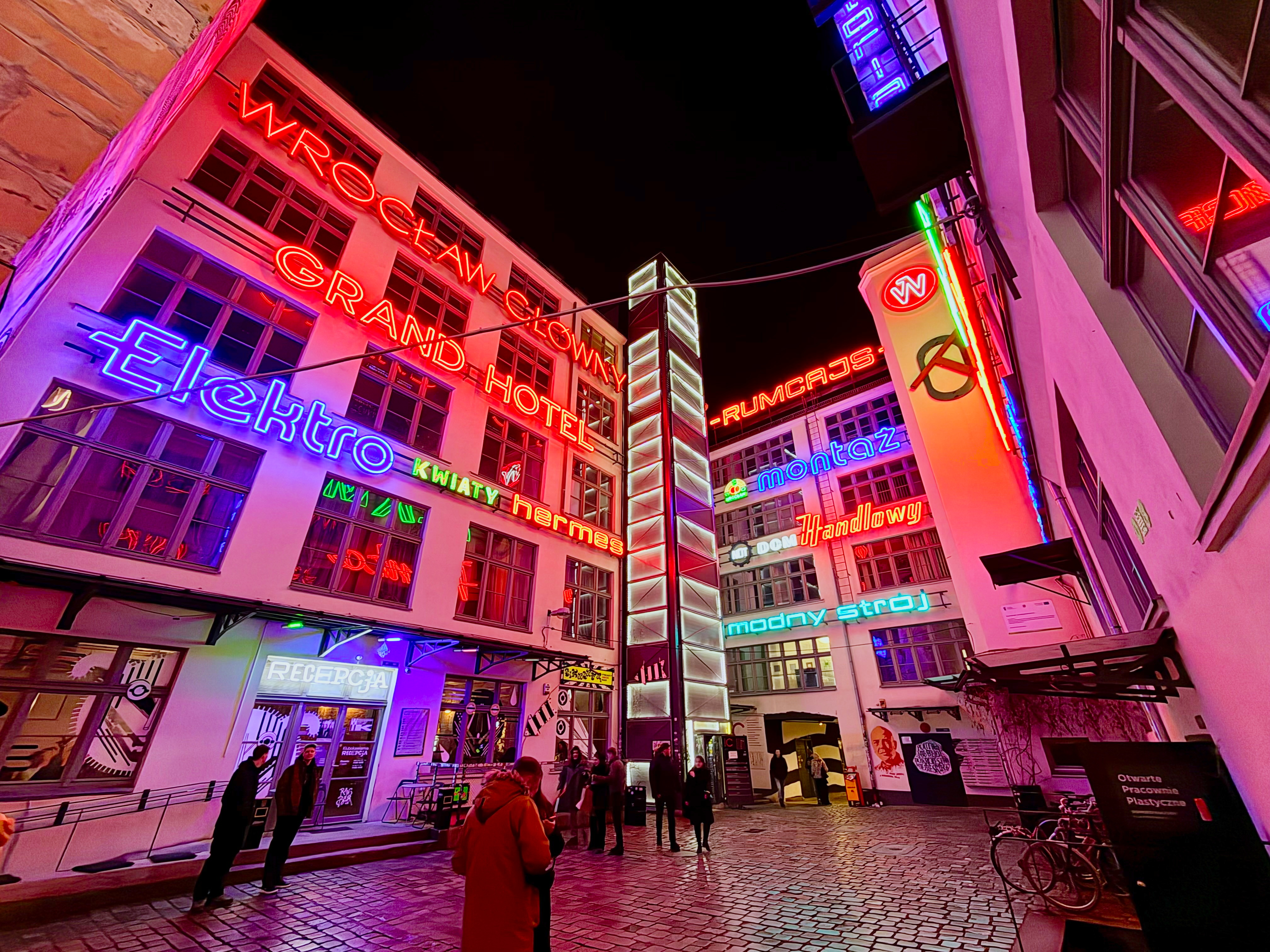
The Neon Sign Gallery, Wrocław, Poland

== See also ==
- Crackle tube
- Plasma globe
- Pundit Light
- Westinghouse Sign
- Timeline of lighting technology
- Neon Museum, Warsaw
