= Railgun (Grand Theft Auto V) =

Fictional weapon in Grand Theft Auto V

- Grand Theft Auto V element
- The Railgun in Grand Theft Auto Online
- First appearance: Grand Theft Auto V
- Created by: Rockstar North

In-universe information
- Type: Electromagnetic weapon
- Function: Weapon
- Affiliation: Coil

The Railgun is a fictional weapon from the 2013 action-adventure game Grand Theft Auto V. It is based on a real-life railgun, using magnets and electromagnetism to fire its projectile.

== Mechanics and in-game ==
The Railgun in Grand Theft Auto V uses electromagnetism and magnets to fire its projectile at an extremely-high velocity. Unlike conventional real-life railguns, the Grand Theft Auto V Railgun is portable and can be carried by any protagonist in both the story mode and Grand Theft Auto Online. In the game, it has a very low rate of fire and can cause very high damage to targets. It has a futuristic appearance, using high-powered explosive rounds as its ammunition. It has also been depicted as an Alien and unusual weapon. The Railgun remains the most expensive weapon in Grand Theft Auto V and the second-most expensive weapon in Grand Theft Auto Online at its original prices.

In the base game stats, it has a damage of 9/10, a speed of 2.5/10, an accuracy of 2/10 and a range of 7/10, as per IGN.

The Railgun features its own set of Shooting Range Challenges inside the in-game fictional weapon chain Ammu-Nation. Radio Times described it as an "experimental heavy weapon" and considered the Railgun as one of the best weapons in the game in terms of speed, range and damage. It is designed as a destructive weapon, capable of destroying most vehicles and its occupants, and the fictional persons in a single hit of its energy beam (ammo). It is stated to fire metallic rounds which are faster than the speed of sound, described as: "the fully automatic battery-operated Railgun fires kinetic energy penetrator rounds that travel at supersonic speed and [whose projectiles] cannot be detected before they hit". The Railgun was first featured in the original enhanced edition of Grand Theft Auto V released in November 2014, and was specifically locked behind it, before being added in other versions later. In-game, it can purchased from Ammu-Nation for $250,000 after the completion of the main storyline mission "Minor Turbulence".

The Railgun remained exclusive to the story mode (Grand Theft Auto V) from its addition in November 2014 until 2023. On January 12, 2023, it was added to Grand Theft Auto Online, the online mode as part of the Los Santos Drug Wars updates; obtainable from the Gun Van in-game. The max ammo capacity was of the gun was capped at 20, same as the story mode. Rockstar Games announced its addition on the occasion of 10th year of Grand Theft Auto Online. Before its addition, the gun was only available in specific adversary modes and several in-game missions, but it could not be generally kept in the free game after the missions. The Gun Van served as the only way to get it without exploits, as it could not be bought from Ammu-Nation or any other location in online. However, the Gun Van inventory rotated every real-life week, making the Railgun temporarily unavailable sometimes.

According to Screen Rant and High Ground Gaming, the Railgun is particularly effective in Grand Theft Auto against those game vehicles with armor, including armored cars, helicopters and tanks. It has no recoil and is able to destroy most cars in one hit, designed for long-distance use with a slow reloading speed. Unlike many other weapons in Grand Theft Auto V and Online, no attachments can be equipped on it. When it was first added in 2023, the weapon was priced at about $657,000; however, later prices of it ranged from $600,000–$730,000.

After the Drug Wars update was announced, by January 6, it could be obtained by players in Grand Theft Auto Online through exploits. One of the main exploit methods to get it was discovered by Floorball, a community member and data miner. This method involved playing a job with a random weapon modifier in Online with another player. The player had a random chance to receive it, and could die and respawn if not received. The player could leave the job through their phone after they got Railgun. This allowed the gun to be kept in a free-roam session, with purchasable ammo by the interaction menu. The gun became one of the later futuristic-styled and exotic weapons to be introduced in Online, being preceded by weapons such as the Up-n-Atomizer and Widowmaker.

== Reception ==
Iain Wilson and Leon Hurley writing for GamesRadar+, stated about the Railgun: "This futuristic shooter uses magnets to fire projectiles at high speed, dealing huge amounts of damage to any target they hit, so it will easily chew through enemies and vehicles alike. It does carry a hefty GTA$730,000 price tag, but the destructive force it provides is well worth the investment." They further add that its maximum ammunition of 20 can be more than enough for normal usage, but its ammo can also be purchased from the Interaction Menu if needed.

In May 2015, a mod was released for the game titled "Nuke Railgun" by user MisterY, which made the weapon more fortified and stronger. Max Strout, a Thingiverse user, was credited with creating a full-size 3D-printed replica of the Railgun on July 18, 2017. The Railgun model used two full spools of black filament and took about 84 hours to fully print. Hypertext reported that the yellow and silver-colored parts seemed to be added with paint. A lighting system was attached to it, controlled by a control box mounted on it.
