= Magnetic gun =

Magnetic gun may refer to:

- Coilgun, a type of mass driver consisting of one or more coils used as electromagnets in the configuration of a linear motor that accelerate a ferromagnetic or conducting projectile to high velocity
- Railgun, a linear motor device that uses electromagnetic force to launch high-velocity projectiles

== See also ==
- Magnetic weapon, one that uses magnetic fields to accelerate or stop projectiles, or to focus charged particle beams
