= Electromagnetic weapon =

Electromagnetic weapon may refer to:

- Electromagnetic pulse (EMP), a brief burst of electromagnetic energy
- Directed-energy weapon (DEW), a ranged weapon that damages its target with highly focused energy without a solid projectile

== See also ==
- Electroshock weapon, an incapacitating weapon that delivers an electric shock aimed at temporarily disrupting muscle functions and/or inflicting pain
- Magnetic weapon, one that uses magnetic fields to accelerate or stop projectiles, or to focus charged particle beams
