= Plasma ball =

Plasma ball may refer to:

- Plasma globe, a man-made, ball-shaped plasma device
- Ball lightning, an atmospheric electrical phenomenon
- Star, a luminous spheroid of plasma held together by self-gravity
- The projectile of some plasma weapons

== See also ==
- Plasma (disambiguation)
