= Lightning sphere =

Lightning sphere may refer to:

- Ball lightning, a controversial atmospheric electrical phenomenon
- Plasma globe, a decorative electrical device using high voltage discharge within a transparent enclosure containing an inert gas
