= Groundstar =

Groundstar may refer to:

- Ancistrocarphus keilii, a flowering plant
- The Groundstar Conspiracy, a crime film
- A plasma globe invented by scientist James Falk
