= Plasma =

Plasma or plasm may refer to:

== Science ==
- Plasma (physics), one of the four fundamental states of matter
- Plasma (mineral), a green translucent silica mineral
- Quark–gluon plasma, a state of matter in quantum chromodynamics

=== Biology ===
- Blood plasma, the yellow-colored liquid component of blood, in which blood cells are suspended
- Cytoplasm, a jelly-like substance that fills cells, suspends and protects organelles
- Germ plasm, a zone in the cytoplasm determining germ cells
- Germplasm, a collection of genetic resources for an organism
- Milk plasma or whey, the liquid remaining after milk has been curdled and strained
- Nucleoplasm, a highly viscous liquid that surrounds the chromosomes and nucleoli
- Plasma cell, white blood cells that secrete large volumes of antibodies
- Protoplasm, the entire living substance inside the cell membrane or cell wall

== Technology ==
- Plasma (game engine), a real-time 3D game engine from Cyan Worlds
- Plasma display, a flat-panel electronic visual display technology, commonly used for televisions
- Plasma effect, a computer-based animated visual effect, used in graphics demonstrations
- KDE Plasma, graphical environments provided by KDE

== Arts, entertainment and media ==
- Plasma (drag queen), an American drag performer
- Plasma (Trey Anastasio album), a 2003 live album
- Plasma (Perfume album), a 2022 studio album
- Plasma (Devil May Cry), a demon appearing in Devil May Cry
- Plasma Records, a record label
- Team Plasma, a fictional villainous organization from Pokémon

== See also ==
- Plasma ball (disambiguation)
- Plasma cannon (disambiguation)
- Plasma gun (disambiguation)
