= James Falk =

- Born: 1 May 1954 (age 72); Pittsburgh, Pennsylvania
- Occupations: research scientist, conceptual engineer, technological artist, inventor and U.S Patent consultant
- Years active: 1970's–present

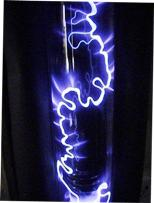
Interactive Plasmas

James Falk (born May 1, 1954) is a research scientist, conceptual engineer, technological artist, inventor and U.S Patent consultant. His invention of the Groundstar style of Plasma globe was commercialized and marketed to collectors and science museums in the 1970s and 1980s. His techno-art was marketed through major retail catalog chains & stores such as The Sharper Image. In 2001 he became chief executive officer of EFX, an art and technology corporation specializing in technology commercialization, scientific research and development and performing arts center design.

Centerpiece experiential art and technology at Disneyland, Walt Disney World Resort (SpectroMagic), EPCOT, The Franklin Institute, Tsukuba Science City and New York City's Times Square (Toys "R" Us) (Roseland Ballroom) are widely recognized contributions from his EFX Invention Laboratory in New Jersey.

He is a Gold Clio Award team member. In 1994 he was a conceptual engineering consultant assisting The Walt Disney Company in the translation of artistic, sculptural and engineering agendas for Beauty and the Beast on Broadway theatre. He was a member of Ann Hould-Ward's 1994 Tony Award team for Beauty and the Beast. The Illuminating Engineering Society awarded him the Edwin F. Guth Award of Excellence, the Lumen Award and the Lumen Award of Merit. He has been a K-12 Project Mentor for the Toshiba Corporation and the National Science Teachers Association Exploravision national scientific contest held in the United States and Canada, Sears Craftsman and National Science Teachers Association Young Inventors Program and the Student Patent Program.
