= Plasma gun =

Plasma gun may refer to:

- Plasma weapon, a type of directed-energy weapon that fires a beam, bolt, or stream of plasma
- Plasma torch, a device for generating a directed flow of plasma
- Plasma railgun, a linear accelerator which uses two long parallel electrodes to accelerate a "sliding short" armature
- Dense plasma focus, a type of plasma generating system originally developed as a fusion power device

== See also ==
- Plasma (disambiguation)
- Plasma cannon (disambiguation)
