= Crackle tube =

Type of plasma lamp

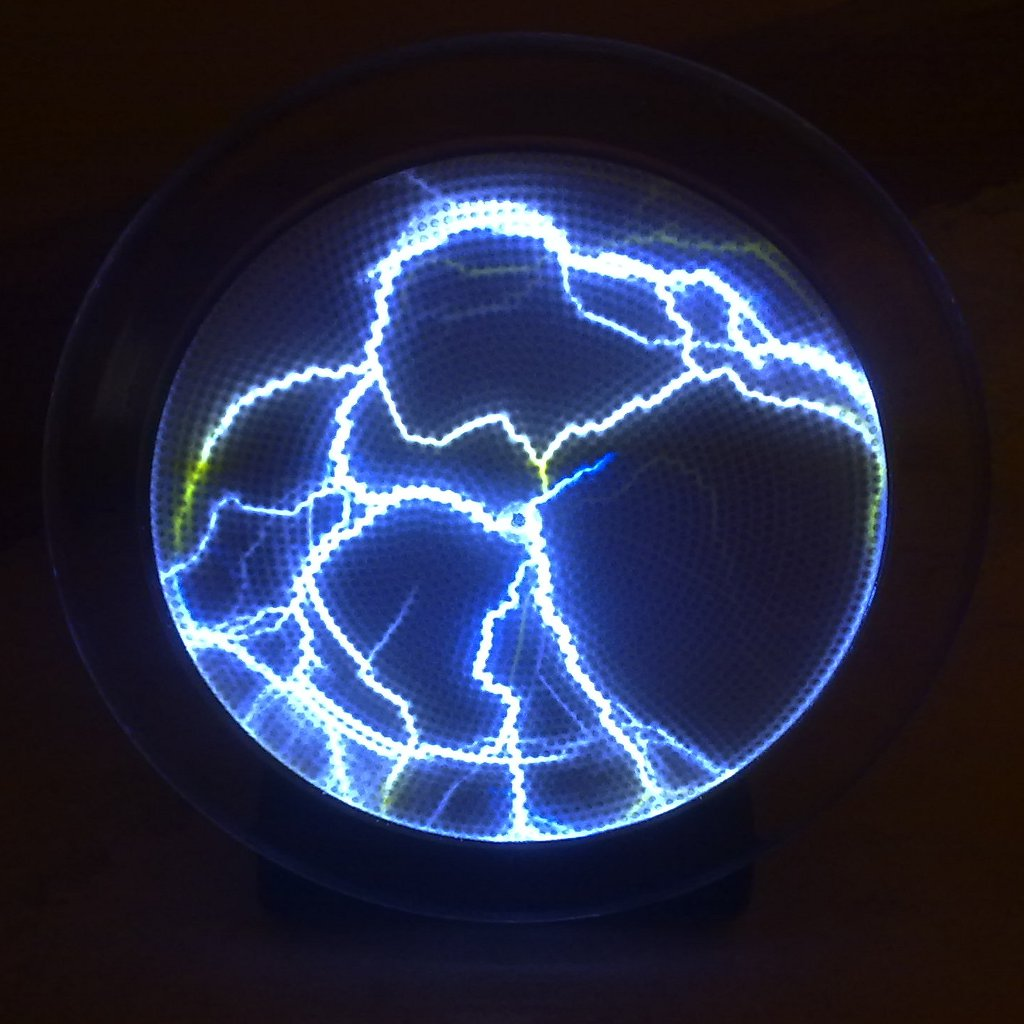
A small battery powered Luminglas device, turned on.

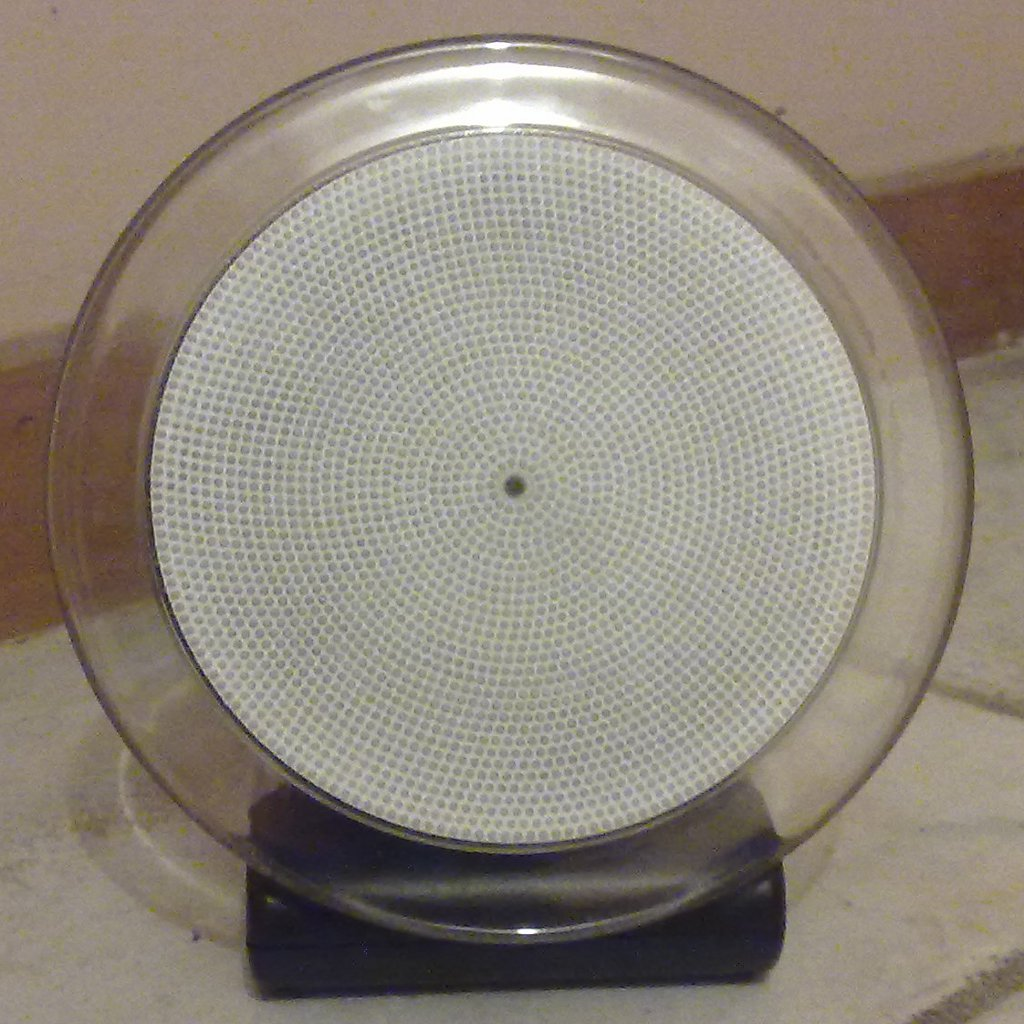
A small battery powered Luminglas device, turned off.

A crackle tube is a type of plasma lamp that is used most commonly in museums, night clubs, movie sets, and other applications where its appearance may be appealing for entertainment. Such a device consists of a double walled glass tube with a hollow center. The cavity between the inner and outer glass tubes is filled with thousands of small phosphor coated glass beads. A 5–14 kV transformer produces a low power gas discharge in the bead filled cavity, producing filaments of light that simulate lightning. Crackle tubes get their name not because of the sound they produce but rather because of the appearance of their internal behavior. The "lightning" (filaments or streamers) is forced around and in between the phosphor-coated glass beads, due to the beads' dielectric nature. In so doing, the phosphor is excited by the electrical energy and fluoresces producing visible light. Like plasma globes, crackle tubes respond to touch; the filaments appear to be "attracted" toward the point of contact and usually become more luminous (brighter) as the electricity is grounded. The tubes are also filled with a noble gas like neon, argon, or xenon which acts as the electron transfer medium of the cavity. The gas is typically below atmospheric pressure.

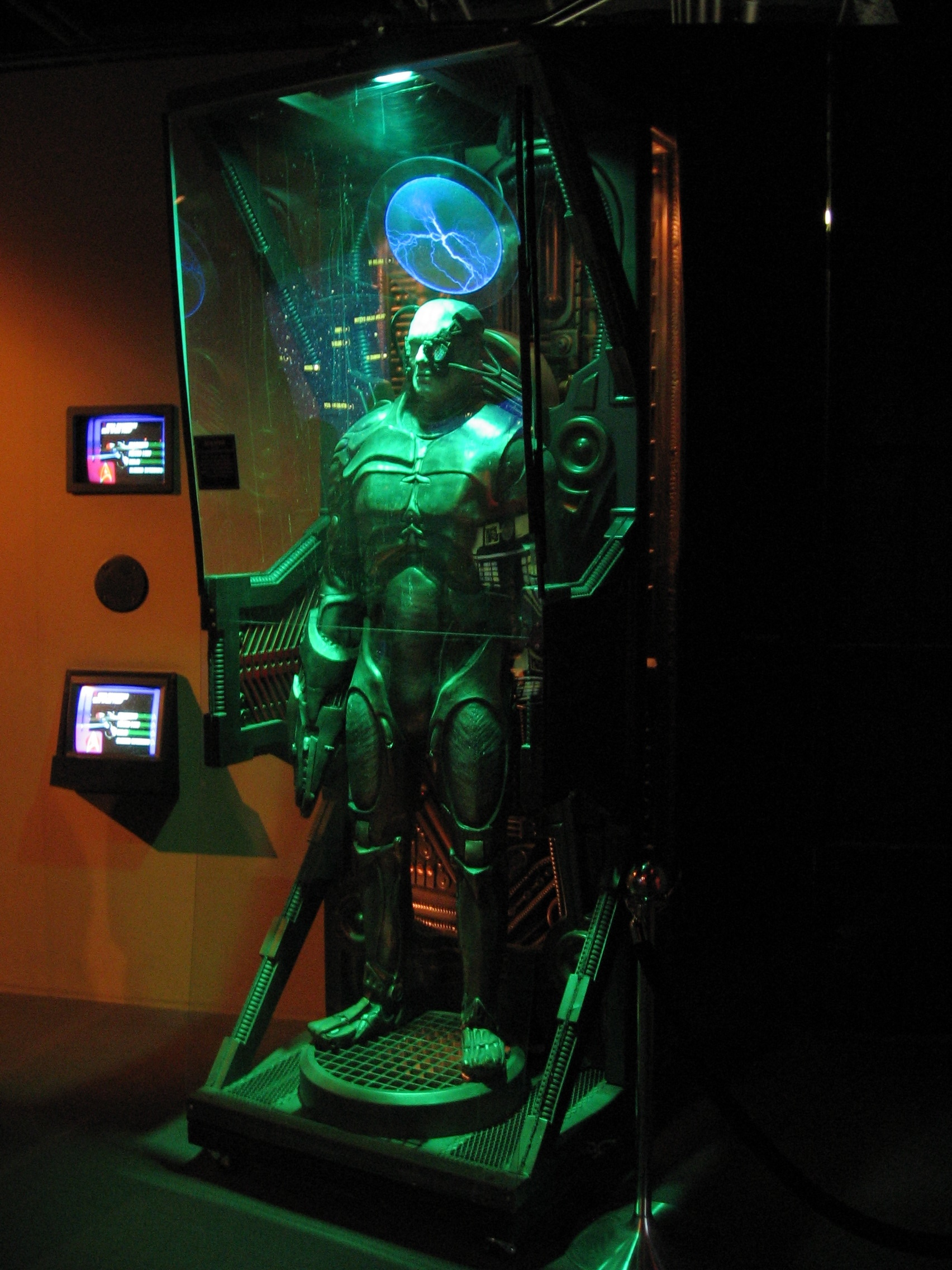
A flat crackle tube is featured as part of a prop representing Star Trek's Borg on display at the Hollywood Entertainment Museum

Typically, crackle tubes are cylindrical, however, they can be made into virtually any shape, even flat plates (trademarked by the name "Luminglas"). The filaments can also be made to any color by combining different chemicals with the base phosphor. The chemical that is used to produce blue filaments is also responsive to ultraviolet light. The filaments can change color as they progress along the length of the tube. This effect is created by using glass beads with different chemical coatings on them, and the color of the filament changes as the electrical discharge transitions from one color layer to another. Chemical coatings can also be combined onto a single coating, allowing for a crackle tube to have multiple simultaneous filaments of several different colors.

Crackle tubes appear white when viewed in their off state under normal lighting conditions. Their luminosity, or light intensity, depends on several factors, but generally crackle tubes are not very bright when compared to a fluorescent light or incandescent lamp. They are best viewed in darkness. Their transformers can also be linked to an acoustic modulator, allowing the tubes to 'respond' to music or ambient noise.

== See also ==
- Plasma (physics)
- List of light sources
