= ExploraVision =

Annual science contest in North America

ExploraVision is a scientific national contest held in the United States and Canada, a joint project by Toshiba Corporation and the National Science Teachers Association. Designed for K–12 students of all interest, skill and ability levels, ExploraVision encourages its participants to create and explore a vision of future technology by developing new ways to apply current science. Since 1992, more than 360,000 students from across the United States and Canada have competed.

== Requirements ==
Each student is limited to one entry per year. Each team must have no more than 4 students. Students and teachers/mentors complete a Toshiba/NSTA ExploraVision Awards Entry Form, signed by the students, coach and mentor, an abstract of their project, a detailed project description, a list of technology used that is available at present time, a bibliography, and five Web page graphics that will be used later to create an official web page for the project. If a team advances to the national level, they will then be challenged with 3 other tasks: 1. Make a prototype displaying how their project would work. 2. Create a video showing both what your project does and why it would be useful. 3. Make a website based on your webpage graphics that displays everything you submitted originally. There is a 1st and 2nd place for national winners. The 1st-place winners receive $10,000 worth of college funds each, and 2nd-place winners get $5,000. Both teams go on an all-expense-paid trip to Washington, D.C., where they get to be on live television, receive their awards and participate in many other activities.

National Winners
	1st Place								2nd Place							
	K-3		04-Jun		07-Sep		10-Dec		K-3		04-Jun		07-Sep		10-Dec	
		School	Invention	School	Invention	School	Invention	School	Invention	School	Invention	School	Invention	School	Invention	School
2018	LD Batchelder Elementary School – North Reading, MA	Integrated Smart Wireless Agriculture Remote Management (iSWARM)	Plainview Old Bethpage Middle School, Plainview, NY	The CFAST- Cystic Fibrosis Absorbent Sponge Technology	St Anthony's High School, South Huntington, NY	Emotion Recognition (EMREC): The personalized future of autism therapy	Ward Melville High School – East Setauket, New York	Polychiral Multi-Walled Carbon Nanotube Solar Cells	St. Thomas the Apostle – Miami, FL	The Smart Toilet	St. Brother Andre – Ottawa, Ontario	Perpetual Energy Motor	The Gagie School – Kalamazoo, Michigan	Word Watch	Valley Academy of Arts and Sciences – Granada Hills, California	Targeted Two-Drug Combo Therapy for Lupus
2017	Bayville Intermediate – Bayville, NY	Float Tees	Bayville Intermediate – Bayville, NY	RCBs (Robotic Cleaning Bivalves)	Next Generation School – Champaign, IL	BioKT: The Wearable Kinetic and Thermoelectric Energy Harvester	West Salem High School – Salem, OR	qSafe: Power Cell of the Future	Nathanael Greene Elementary School – Stanardsville, VA	The Aller Watch	Pine View Elementary – Land O'Lakes, FL	The Coral Reef MGS	Commack High School – Commack, NY	Scat Scan: The Future of Microbiome Analysis	Stuyvesant High School – New York, NY	Using carbon nanospheres to reduce decoherence in quantum computing systems
2016	Bayville Intermediate – Bayville, NY	The Tick Detective – Creating a scanning device to detect the presence of a deer tick on the human body	Locust Valley Intermediate School – Locust Valley, NY	Hubble NEST (Next Elimination of Space Trash)	Rothesay Netherwood School – Rothesay, New Brunswick	Bulletproof Vests	University Laboratory High School – Urbana, IL	BEISight: Bionic Eye Implant for Sight	Chapman Hill – Salem, OR	Triple-E: Edible, Electrolyte Balanced, Eco-Friendly Water Bottle	The Village School – Houston, TX	A.P.P.	Arlington High School – Lagrangeville, NY	The VISOR: A Neuro-olfaction Device for Perceiving Smell Remotely	Plainview Old Bethpage JFK High School – Plainview, NY	Intra-Neuromuscular Cellular Regeneration Promoter
2015	Waldron Mercy Academy – Merion Station, PA	S.T.A.R. Sea Turtle Assistance Rod	Pine View Middle School – Land O’Lakes, FL	The Green Tablet	Marlboro Memorial Middle School – Morganville, NJ	Survival of the Freshest: Preservation of Organic Food	West Salem High School – Salem, OR	Programmable Bio-Scaffolding: The Suture of the Future	Holmes Elementary – San Diego, CA	SportaVision	Harford Day School – Bel air, MD	Clarité – A Better Cochlear Implant	Battle Creek Area Math & Science Center – Battle Creek, MI	Heat Utilizing Hearing Aids	Northview High School – Duluth, GA	External Microbial Cleansing Device- EMCD
2014	John Ross Elementary – Edmond, OK	Hot Car Safety System	Locust Valley Intermediate School – Locust Valley, NY	Plant Power – Super-hydrophobic Lotus Leaf	Marlboro Middle School – Marlboro, NJ	iGlasses – The Eyeglasses of the Future?	West Salem High School – Salem, OR	Quantum Dot Energy Harvesters for Powering Implantable Medical Devices	Waldron Mercy Academy – Merion Station, PA	S.A.F.E.R. (Saving All Friends Escaping Rip currents)	Countryside Montessori Charter – Land O' Lakes, FL	WateRenew: Wave Power for Clean Water	Northview High School – Duluth, GA	Kidney Microfilter Regulation Device (K.M.R.D.)	W. L. Mackenzie C. I. - Toronto, ON	LTCHDTM using P-SOT
2013	LD Batchelder Elementary School – North Reading, MA	The SIGHT System	Chapman Hill Elementary School – Salem, OR	SMART Moves	Kilmer Middle School – Vienna, VA	Food Allergen Detector	Bellarmine College Preparatory – San Jose, CA	Immunotargeted DNA-based nanostructures for the delivery of the pro-angiogenic VEGF protein to revascularize infarcted myocardium	Kingsley Elementary – Evanston, IL	Lice-A-Nator	Mitchell Intermediate School – The Woodlands, TX	L.E.A.D.S.(Laminitis Equine Absolute Diagnosis System)	The Alternative School for Math and Science – Corning, NY	The Opti Arm-An Optical Interface Prosthetic Device	Our Lady of Lourdes Academy – Miami, FL	S2I
2012	LD Batchelder Elementary School – North Reading, MA	SMART Desk	Fairmont Private School – Anaheim, CA	Helping the World's Silent Side	David Thompson Secondary School – Vancouver, BC	Thermoresponsive Hydrogel Injection	North Carolina School of Science and Mathematics – Durham, NC	Amphipathic Films for Water Collection	Flippen Elementary School – McDonough, GA	COOL Pads: Shoulder Pads that Keep Players Safe from Overheating	Countryside Montessori Charter – Land O'Lakes, FL	The S.M.A.R.T. School	The Alternative School for Math and Science – Corning, NY	Radiclear — A System to Filter Radium from Water	Westwood High School – Austin, TX	LANAPT (Ligand Attached Nanoshells Assisting Photothermal Therapy)
2011	Discovery Montessori School – Edinburg, TX	i.streets (Intelligent Streets)	Virginia Virtual Academy – Herndon, VA	The HEADS UP! Helmet	Horace Mann School – Bronx, NY	Subway Smart System	Hopewell Valley Central High School – Pennington, NJ	Bionic Auditory Prosthesis	Countryside Montessori Charter – Land O' Lakes, FL	The Solar Tree	Plainview Old Bethpage Middle School – Plainview, NY	BlindSight	West Hills Middle School – West Bloomfield, MI	I-TBS: Intra-trachea Breathing System	Stuyvesant High School – New York, NY	3Drenal: Kidney Bio-Printer
2010			Scofield Magnet Middle School – Samford, CT	Community Algae BioReactor	Forest Ridge School – Bellevue, WA	EPPIC – Ecological Paper Printing and Ink Collector	University Laboratory High School – Urbana, IL	NIBEye: Neural Interfaced Bionic Eye	Tampa Christian Community School – Tampa, FL	Smart Touch First Aid Kit	Fairmont Private School – Anaheim, CA	Automatic Correcting Eyeglasses (A.C.E.)	Ma’ayanot Yeshiva High School for Girls – Teaneck, NJ	REGENX: Human Limb Regenerative Protein Cocktail Injections	Stuyvesant High School – New York, NY	I-CEE: IKVAV — Scaffold Center-Surround Eyesight Enhancement
