= Plasma cannon =

Plasma cannon may refer to:

- Plasma weapon, a type of directed-energy weapon that fires a beam, bolt, or stream of plasma
- Plasma railgun, a linear accelerator which uses two long parallel electrodes to accelerate a "sliding short" armature
  - MARAUDER, a United States Air Force Research Laboratory project concerning the development of a coaxial plasma railgun

== See also ==
- Plasma (disambiguation)
- Plasma gun (disambiguation)
