= Plasma globe =

Decorative electrical device

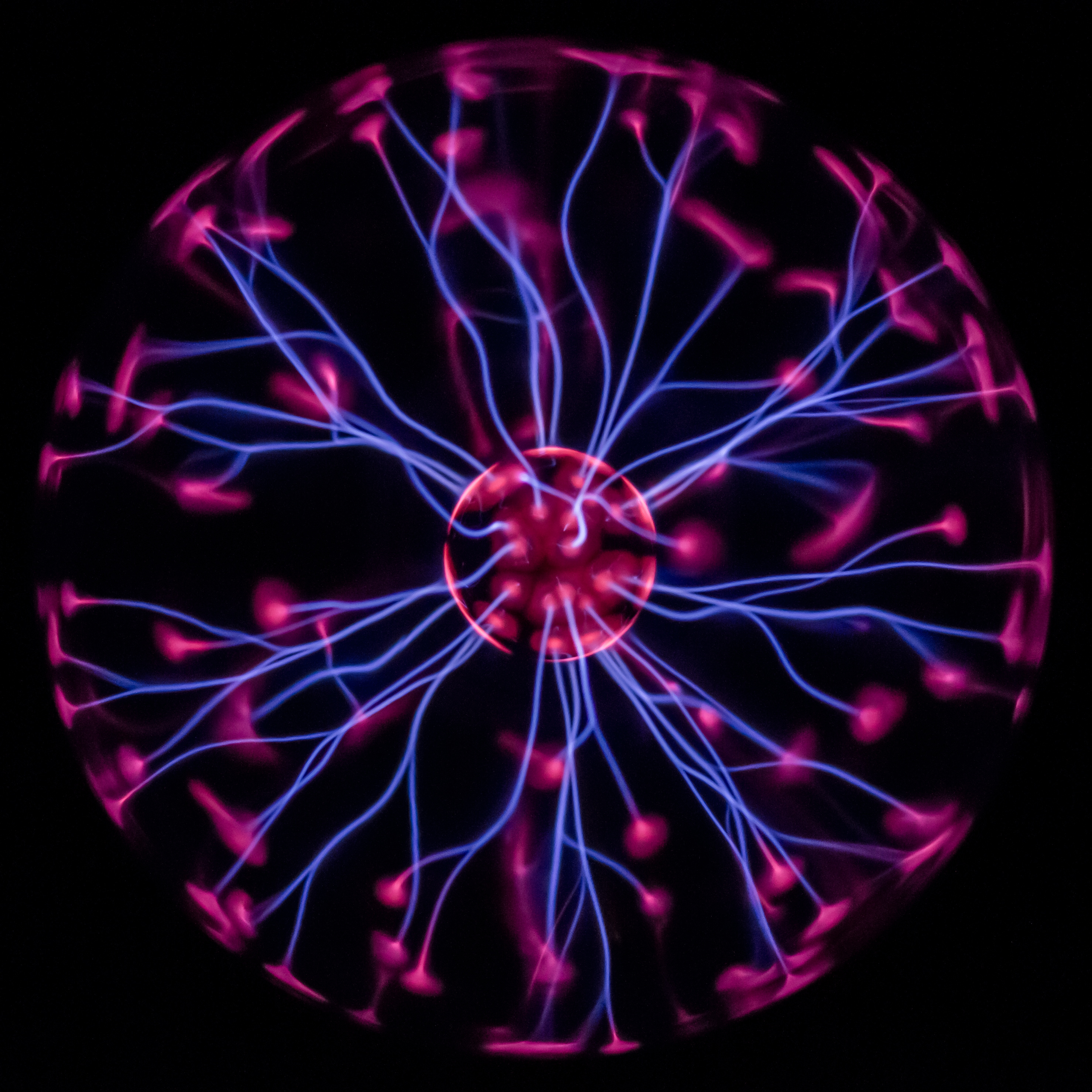
A plasma ball with filaments extending between the inner and outer spheres

A plasma globe, plasma ball, or plasma lamp is a clear glass container filled with noble gases, usually a mixture of neon, krypton, and xenon, that has a high-voltage electrode in the center of the container. When voltage is applied, a plasma is formed within the container. Plasma filaments extend from the inner electrode to the outer glass insulator, giving the appearance of multiple constant beams of colored light. Plasma balls were popular as novelty items in the 1980s.

The plasma lamp was invented by Nikola Tesla, during his experimentation with high-frequency currents in an evacuated glass tube for the purpose of studying high voltage phenomena. Tesla called his invention an "inert gas discharge tube". The modern plasma lamp design was developed by James Falk and MIT student Bill Parker.

A crackle tube is a related device filled with phosphor-coated beads.

== Construction ==
Although many variations exist, a plasma ball is usually a clear glass sphere filled with a low-pressure mixture of various gases (most commonly neon, sometimes with other noble gases such as argon, xenon and krypton).

Plasma balls are driven by high-frequency (approximately 35 kHz) alternating current at 2–5 kV. The drive circuit is essentially a specialized power inverter, in which current from a lower-voltage DC supply powers a high-frequency electronic oscillator circuit whose output is stepped up by a high-frequency, high-voltage transformer, for example a miniature Tesla coil or a flyback transformer. The radio-frequency energy from the transformer is transmitted into the gas within the ball through an electrode at its center. Additionally, some designs utilize the ball as a resonant cavity, which provides positive feedback to the drive transistor through the transformer. A much smaller hollow glass orb can also serve as an electrode when it is filled with metal wool or a conducting fluid that is in communication with the transformer output. In this case, the radio-frequency energy is admitted into the larger space by capacitive coupling right through the glass. Plasma filaments extend from the inner electrode to the outer glass insulator, giving the appearance of moving tendrils of colored light within the volume of the ball. If a hand is placed close to the ball it produces a faint smell of ozone, as the gas is produced by high voltage interaction with atmospheric oxygen.

Some balls have a control knob that varies the amount of power going to the center electrode. At the very lowest setting that will light or "strike" the ball, a single tendril is made. This single tendril's plasma channel engages enough space to transmit this lowest striking energy to the outside world through the glass of the ball. As the power is increased, this single channel's capacity is overwhelmed and a second channel forms, then a third, and so on. The tendrils each compete for a footprint on the inner orb as well. The energies flowing through these are all of the same polarity, so they repel each other as like charges: a thin dark boundary surrounds each footprint on the inner electrode.

The ball is prepared by pumping out as much air as is practical. The ball is then backfilled with neon to a pressure similar to one atmosphere. If the radio-frequency power is turned on, if the ball is "struck" or "lit", now, the whole ball will glow a diffuse red. If a little argon is added, the filaments will form. If a very small amount of xenon is added, the "flowers" will bloom at the ends of the filaments.

The neon available for purchase for a neon-sign shop often comes in glass flasks at the pressure of a partial vacuum. These cannot be used to fill a ball with a useful mixture. Tanks of gas, each with its specific, proper, pressure regulator and fitting, are required: one for each of the gases involved.

Of the other noble gases, radon is radioactive, helium escapes through the glass relatively quickly, and krypton is expensive. Other gases such as mercury vapor can be used. Molecular gases may be dissociated by the plasma.

== Interaction ==
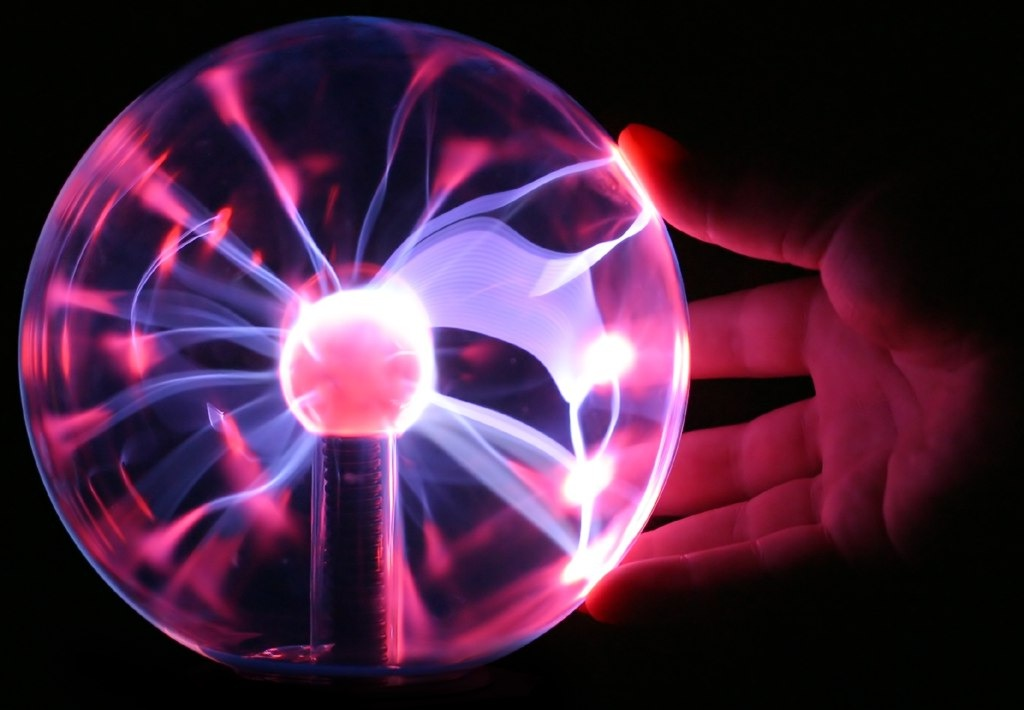
The effect of a conducting object (a hand) touching the plasma ball

Placing a finger tip on the glass creates an attractive spot for the energy to flow because the conductive human body (having an internal resistance less than 1000 ohms) is more easily polarized than the dielectric material around the electrode (i.e. the gas within the ball) providing an alternative discharge path having less resistance. Therefore, the capacity of the large conducting body to accept radio frequency energy is greater than that of the surrounding air. The energy available to the filaments of plasma within the ball will preferentially flow toward the better acceptor. This flow also causes a single filament, from the inner ball to the point of contact, to become brighter and thinner. The filament is brighter because there is more current flowing through it and into the human body, which has a capacitance of about 100 pF. The filament is thinner because the magnetic fields around it, augmented by the now-higher current flowing through it, cause a magnetohydrodynamic effect called pinch: the plasma channel's own magnetic fields create a force acting to compress the size of the plasma channel itself.

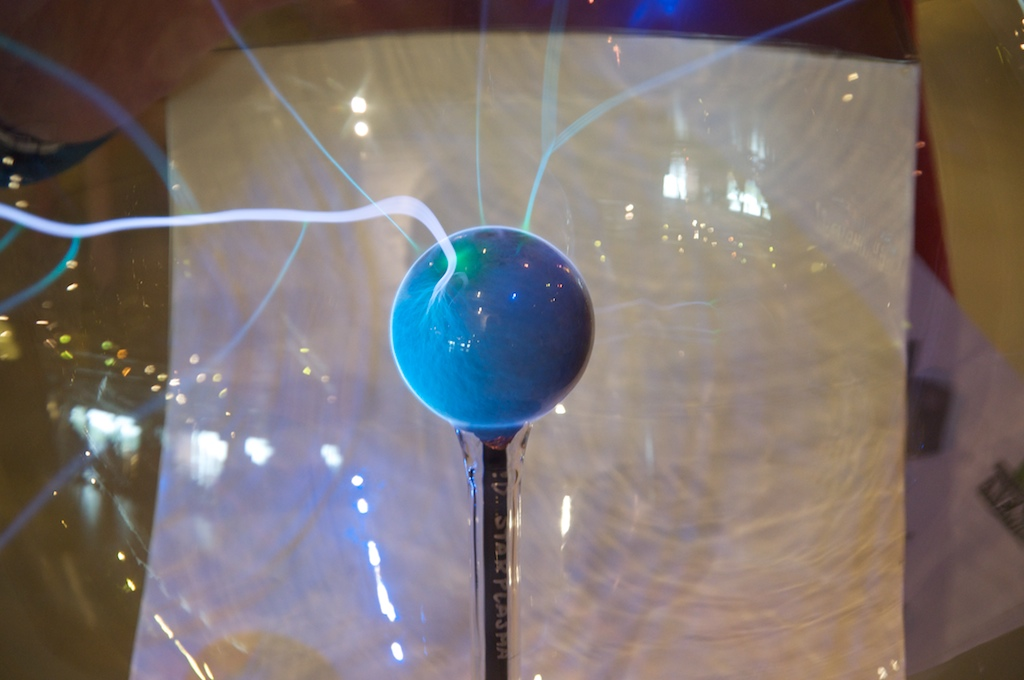
A "Tesla ball" at the NEMO science museum in Amsterdam

Much of the movement of the filaments is due to heating of the gas around the filament. When gas along the filament is heated, it becomes more buoyant and rises, carrying the filament with it. If the filament is discharging into a fixed object (like a hand) on the side of the ball, it will begin to deform into a curved path between the central electrode and the object. When the distance between the electrode and the object becomes too great to maintain, the filament will break and a new filament will reform between the electrode and the hand.

An electric current is produced within any conductive object near the orb. The glass acts as a dielectric in a capacitor formed between the ionized gas and the hand.

== Gallery ==
By adjusting the voltage, frequency, chemical composition and pressure of gas in the globe, many colorful effects can be achieved.

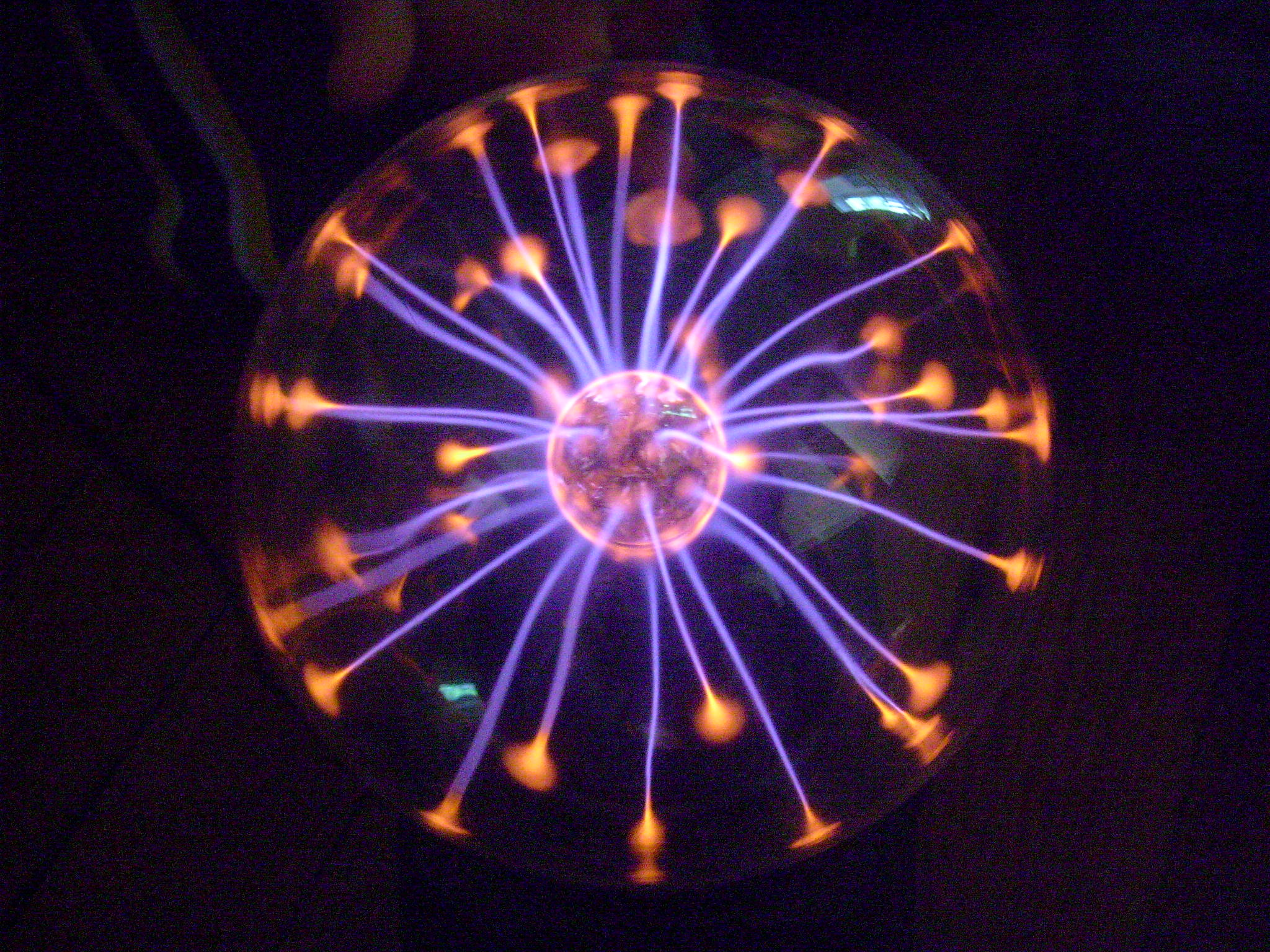

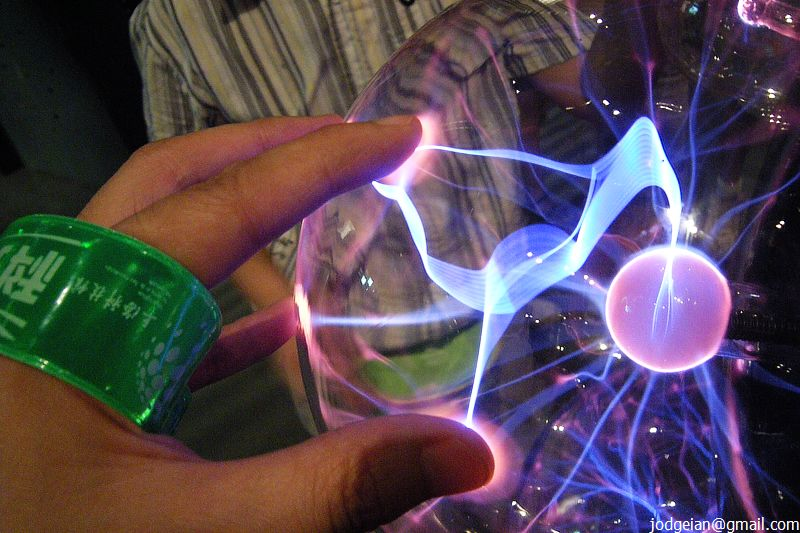

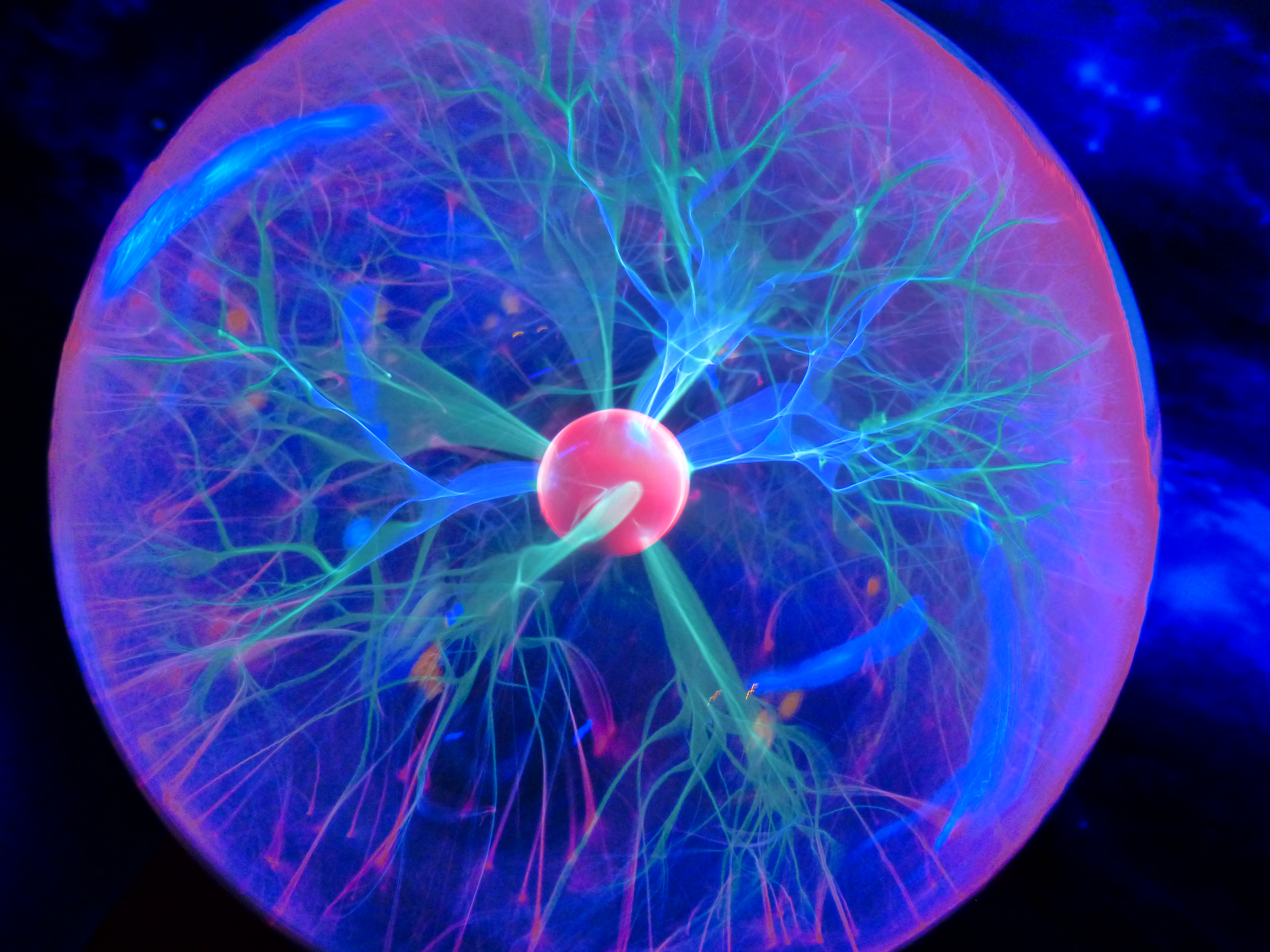

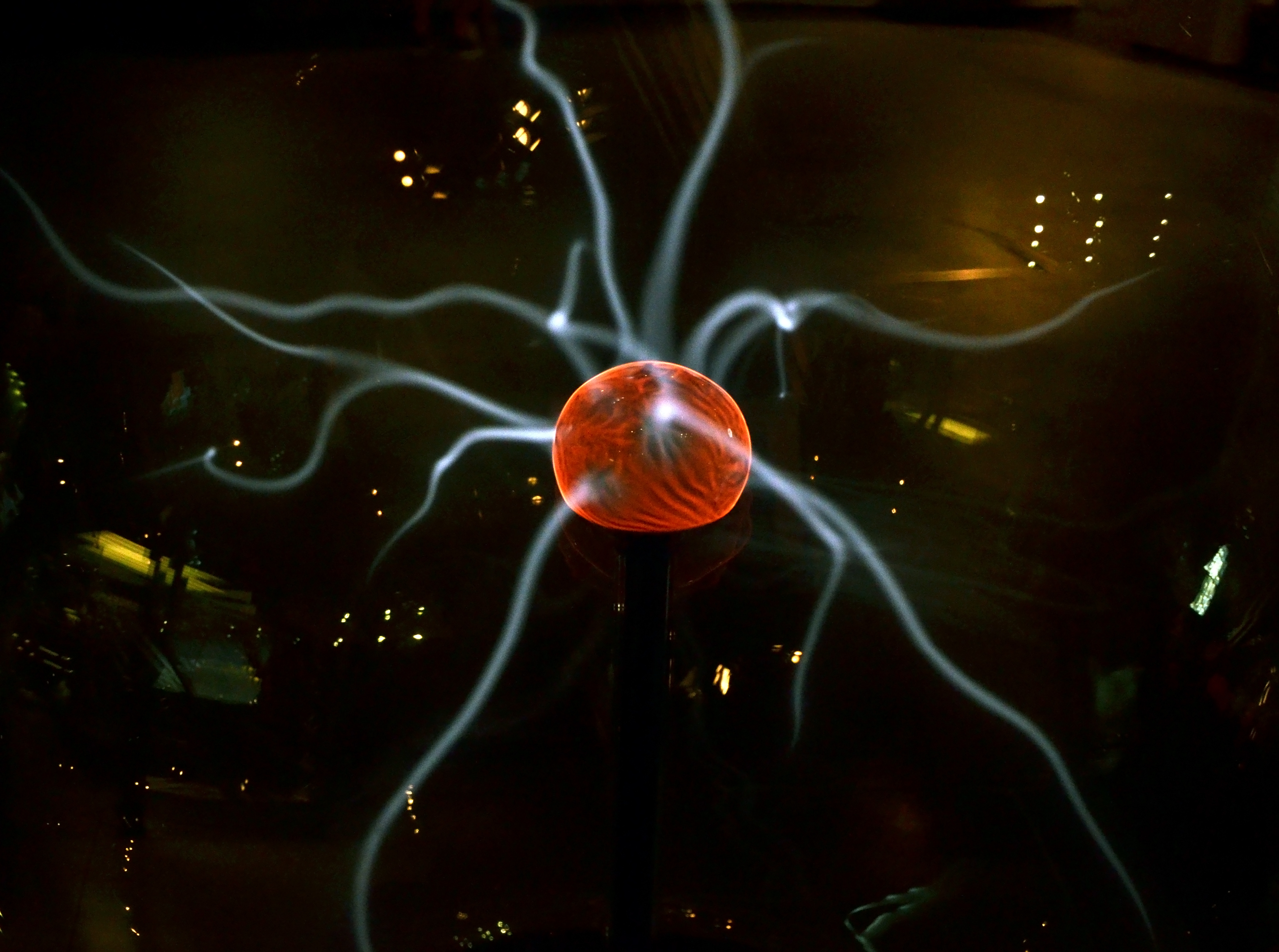

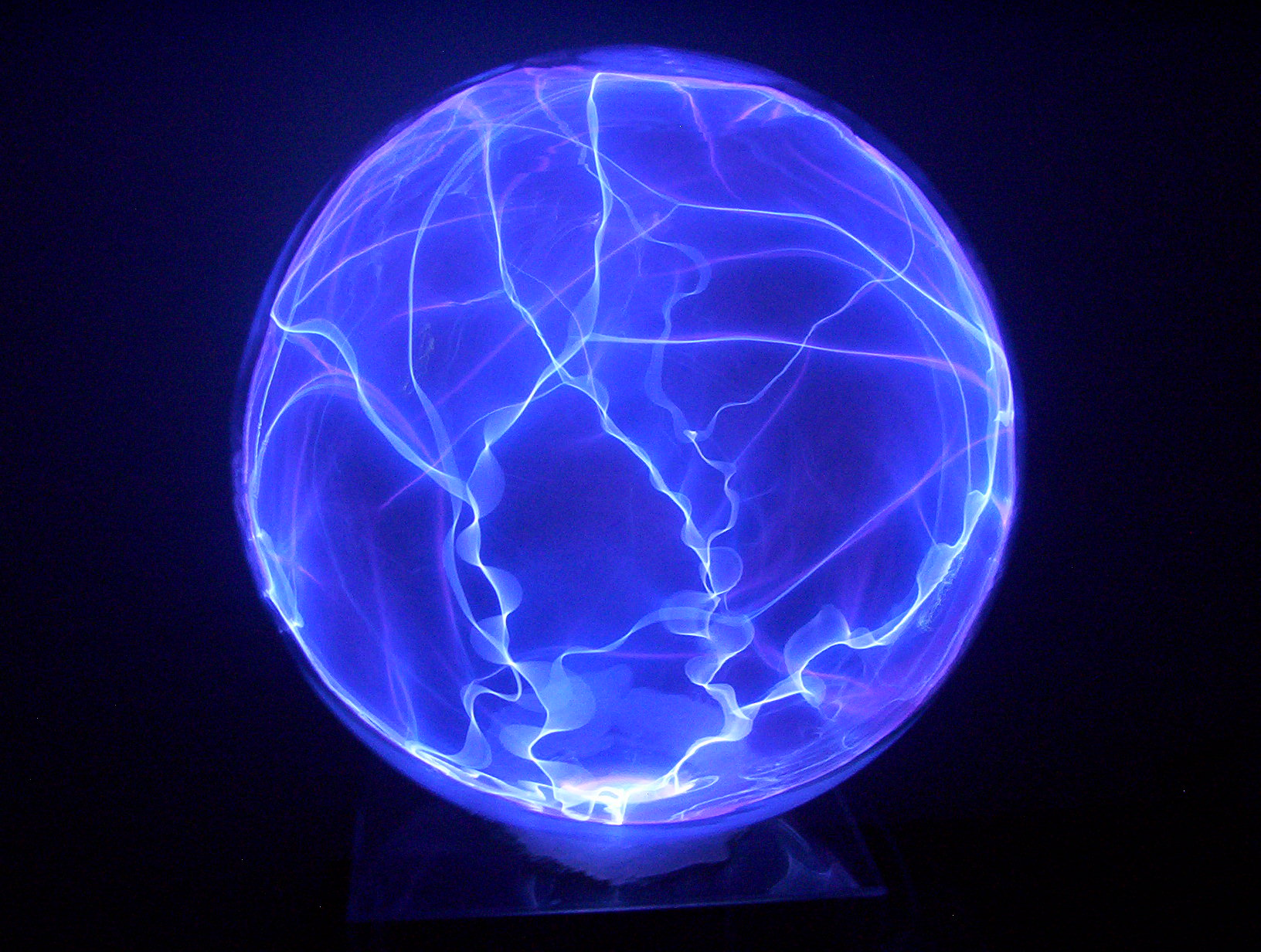

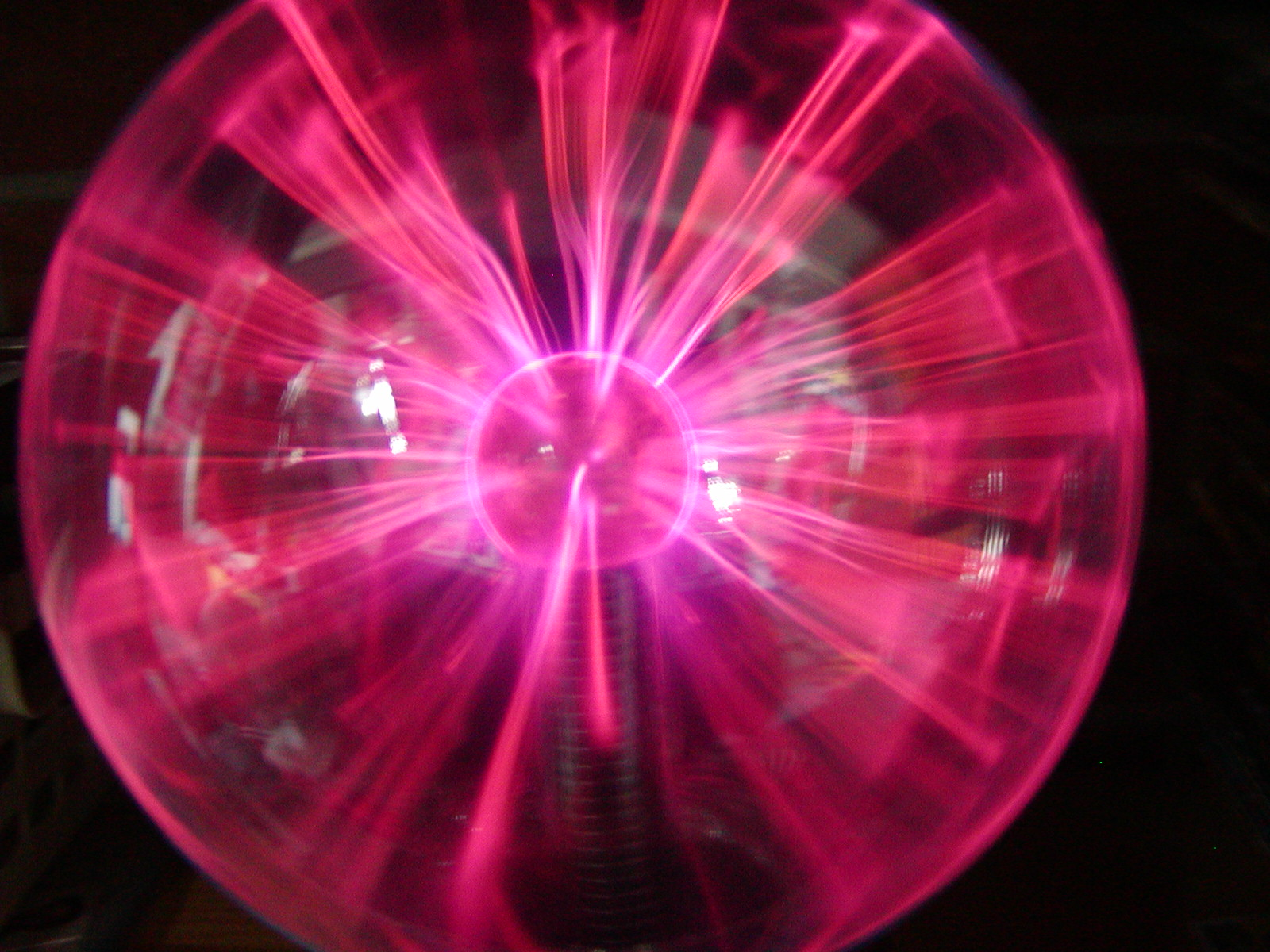

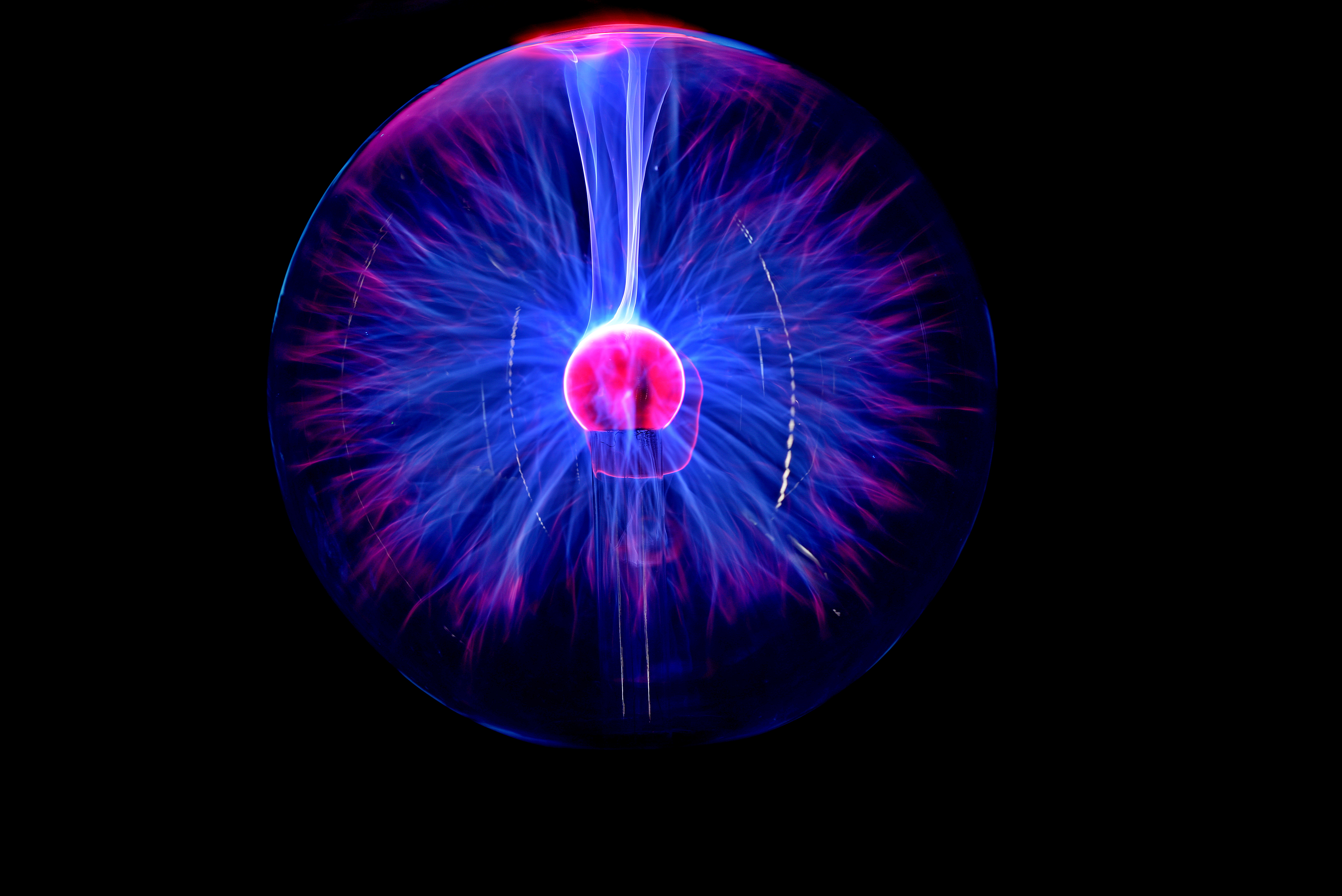

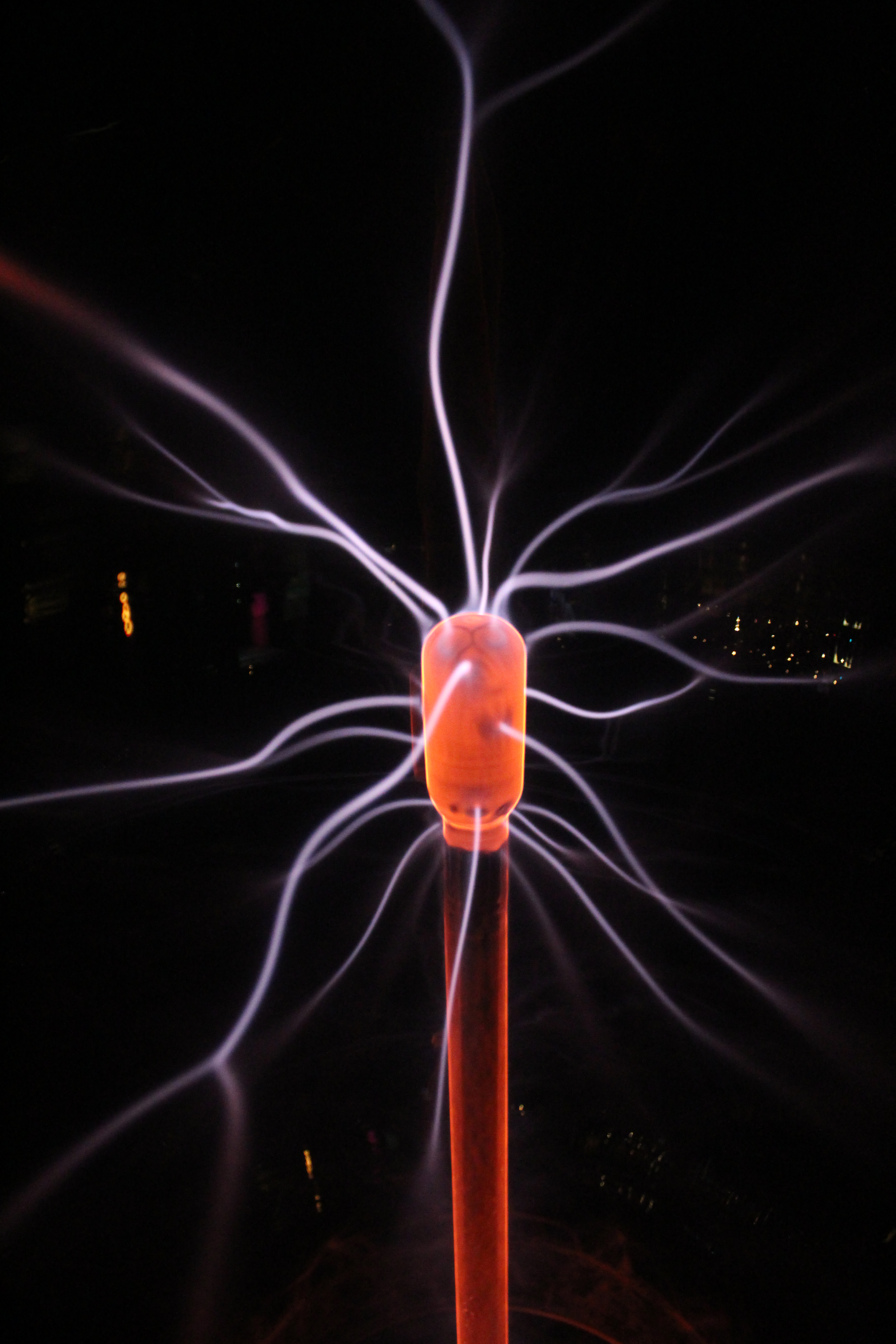

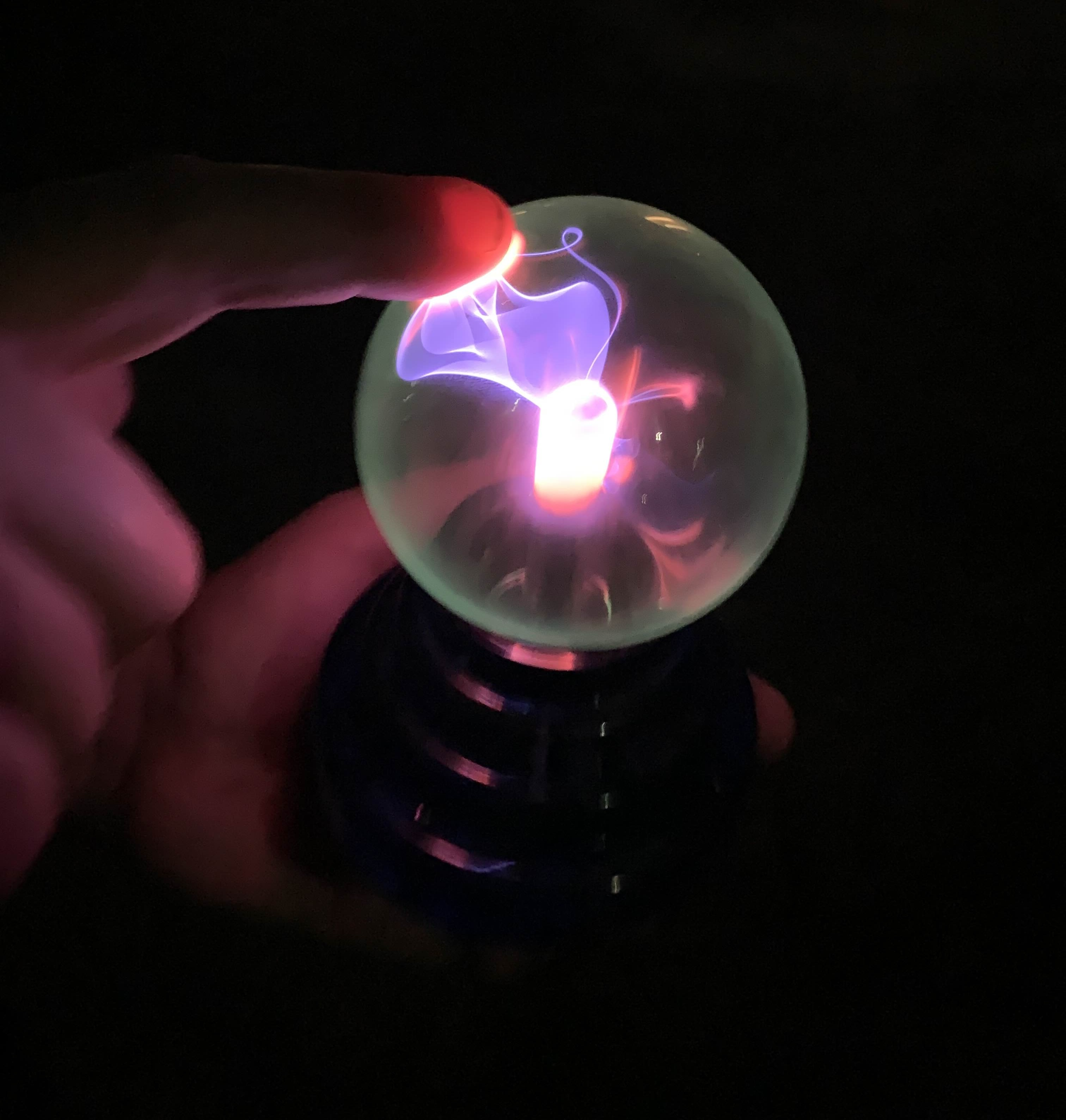

== History ==
Video of plasma ball

In U.S. patent 0,514,170 ("Incandescent Electric Light", 1894 February 6), Nikola Tesla describes a plasma lamp. This patent is for one of the first high-intensity discharge lamps. Tesla used an incandescent-type lamp ball with a single internal conductive element and excited the element with high voltage currents from a Tesla coil, thus creating the brush discharge emanation. He gained patent protection on a particular form of the lamp in which a light-giving small body or button of refractory material is supported by a conductor entering a very highly exhausted ball or receiver. Tesla called this invention the single terminal lamp, or, later, the "Inert Gas Discharge Tube".

The Groundstar style of plasma ball was created by James Falk and marketed to collectors and science museums in the 1970s and 1980s. Jerry Pournelle in 1984 praised Orb Corporation's Omnisphere as "the most fabulous object in the entire world" and "magnificent ... a new kind of art object", stating "you can't buy mine for any price".

The technology needed to formulate gas mixtures used in today's plasma spheres was not available to Tesla. Modern lamps typically use combinations of xenon, krypton and neon, although other gases can be used. These gas mixtures, along with different glass shapes and integrated-circuit-driven electronics, create the vivid colors, range of motions, and complex patterns seen in today's plasma spheres.

== Applications ==
Plasma balls are mainly used as curiosities or toys for their unique lighting effects and the "tricks" that can be performed on them by users moving their hands around them. They might also form part of a school's laboratory equipment for demonstration purposes. They are not usually employed for general lighting. However, in recent years, some novelty stores have begun selling miniature plasma ball nightlights that can be mounted on a standard light socket.

Plasma balls can be used for experimenting with high voltages. If a conductive plate or wire coil is placed on the ball, capacitive coupling can transfer enough voltage to the plate or coil to produce a small arc or energize a high voltage load. This is possible because the plasma inside the ball and the conductor outside it act as plates of a capacitor, with the glass in between as a dielectric. A step-down transformer connected between the plate and the ball's electrode can produce lower-voltage, higher-current radio frequency output. Careful earth grounding is essential to prevent injury or damage to equipment.

== Hazards ==
Bringing conductive materials or electronic devices close to a plasma ball may cause the glass to become hot. The high voltage radio frequency energy coupled to them from within the ball may cause a mild electric shock to the person touching, even through a protective glass casing. The radio frequency field produced by plasma balls can interfere with the operation of touchpads used on laptop computers, digital audio players, cell phones, and other similar devices. Some types of plasma ball can radiate sufficient radio frequency interference (RFI) to interfere with cordless telephones and Wi-Fi devices several feet or some meters away.

If an electrical conductor touches the outside of the ball, capacitive coupling can induce enough potential on it to produce a small arc. This is possible because the ball's glass acts as a capacitor dielectric: the inside of the lamp acts as one plate, and the conductive object on the outside acts as the opposite capacitor plate. This is a dangerous action that can damage the ball or other electronic devices, and presents a fire ignition hazard.

Perceptible amounts of ozone can be formed on the surface of a plasma ball.

In July 2022, a spark from a plasma globe at the Questacon museum in Canberra, ignited the alcohol-based hand sanitiser that had been applied to a child's hands, leaving them with serious burns.

== See also ==
- Fusor
- List of light sources
- Sulfur lamp
- Vacuum arc
