= List of light sources =

Devices and processes that produce light

This article lists sources of light, the visible part of the electromagnetic spectrum. It focuses on primary light sources (which emit light) rather than secondary light sources (which reflect or transmit light). Primary light sources produce photons from another energy source, such as heat, chemical reactions, or conversion of mass or a different frequency of electromagnetic radiation, and include light bulbs and stars like the Sun. Secondary light sources (e.g., cat eyes, retroreflectors) do not actually produce the light that comes from them.

A common and fundamental means of classifying primary light sources is on the basis of the mechanism(s) of light emission. Light is generated when an electric charge undergoes acceleration, typically through incandescence or luminescence. Light from real light sources (e.g., stars, gas mantles, limelight, phosphor-based white LEDs) is often from a combination of mechanisms. Real light sources can in turn be categorised as anthropic ("artificial") or naturally occurring.

== Incandescence ==
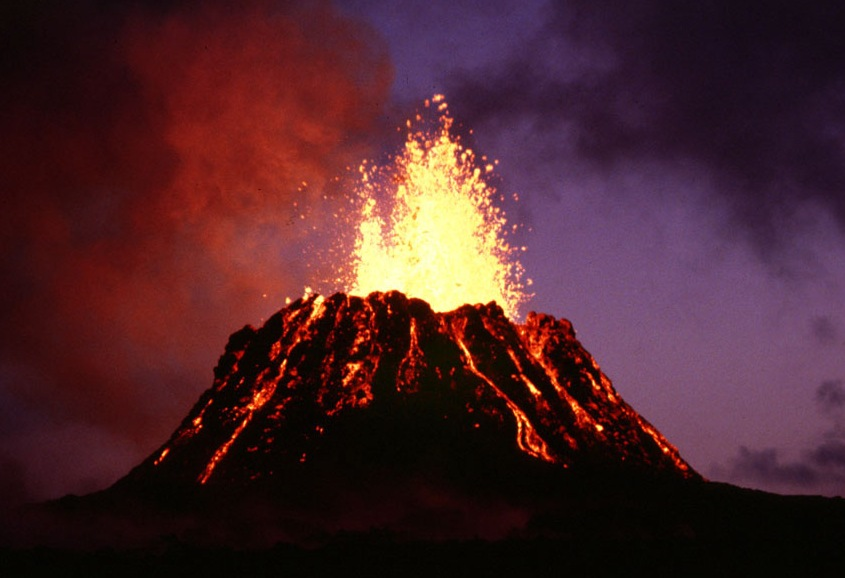
Lava from volcanic eruption

Incandescence is the emission of visible radiation (light) due to the thermal excitation of atoms or molecules. It is thermal radiation, which emerges from the conversion of kinetic energy associated with heat, resulting in continuous spectra, which extend into the visible region when temperatures are sufficiently high. The lowest temperature at which thermal radiation is visible, known as the Draper point, is approximately 798 K (525 °C; 977 °F).

- Incandescent light bulb – Electric light bulb with a resistively heated wire filament
- Lava – Molten rock expelled by a volcano during an eruption
- Nernst lamp – Early form of lamp using an incandescent ceramic rod
- Sun – Star at the centre of the Solar System

== Luminescence ==
Luminescence is any emission of light not ascribable directly to incandescence. One mechanism is atomic electron transition, which generally results in discrete spectra from tightly-bound core electrons. The similar mechanism of recombination involves loosely-bound or free electrons in the valence or conduction bands, and can result in continuous spectra from plasmas and optoelectronic semiconductor devices.

Many terms exist to describe different kinds of luminescence. Their meanings can overlap (e.g., due to a sequence of events), and continue to evolve with time, sometimes leading to confusion. One recent example was the initial use of shrimpoluminescence to playfully describe shrimp-induced sonoluminescence.

=== Candoluminescence ===
Candoluminescence is light given off by certain materials at high temperatures (usually when exposed to a flame) that has an intensity at some wavelengths which can be higher than the blackbody emission expected from incandescence at the same temperature.

- Gas mantle – Device for generating bright light when heated by a flame
- Limelight – Type of stage lighting once used in theatres and music halls

=== Cathodoluminescence ===
Cathodoluminescence is luminescence produced by the bombardment of a metal or a phosphor by electrons.

- Cathode-ray tube – Vacuum tube used to display images

=== Chemiluminescence ===
Chemiluminescence is luminescence resulting from a chemical reaction (e.g., lyoluminescence).

- Chemical laser – Laser that obtains energy from chemical reactions
- Glow stick – Self-contained, short-term light source
- Luminol – Chemical compound

==== Bioluminescence ====
Bioluminescence is light emitted by living organisms due to chemiluminescence. Thousands of species exhibit bioluminescence, so only some of the best-known examples are listed here, illustrating the range from microorganisms to relatively large creatures.

- Aequorea victoria – Species of hydrozoan
- Antarctic krill – Species of krill
- Deep-sea anglerfish – Suborder of fishes
- Firefly – Family of beetles
- Foxfire – Fungal bioluminescence
- Glowworm – Bioluminescent insect larva
- Lanternfish – Family of ray-finned fishes
- Panellus stipticus – Species of fungus
- Parchment worm – Genus of annelid worms
- Phytoplankton – Autotrophic members of the plankton ecosystem
- Piddock – Family of bivalves
- Sea pansy – Species of coral

=== Crystalloluminescence ===
Crystalloluminescence is luminescence during the process of crystallization, specifically during nucleation.

- Potassium sulfate

=== Cryoluminescence ===
Cryoluminescence is luminescence when an object is cooled or observable only at low temperatures.

- Wulfenite
- Zinc sulfide phosphors

=== Electrochemiluminescence ===
Electrochemiluminescence is luminescence resulting from an electrochemical reaction.

- Light-emitting electrochemical cell – Light generation methodology

=== Electroluminescence ===
Electroluminescence is luminescence caused by the action of an electric field in a gas or in a solid material. Electroluminescent materials (e.g., LEDs, OLEDs) can exhibit fluorescence, delayed fluorescence, and/or phosphorescence.

- Electroluminescent display – Illuminated flat panel display
- Electroluminescent wire – Capacitive light source in the form of a wire
- Field-induced polymer electroluminescent – Electroluminescent light source

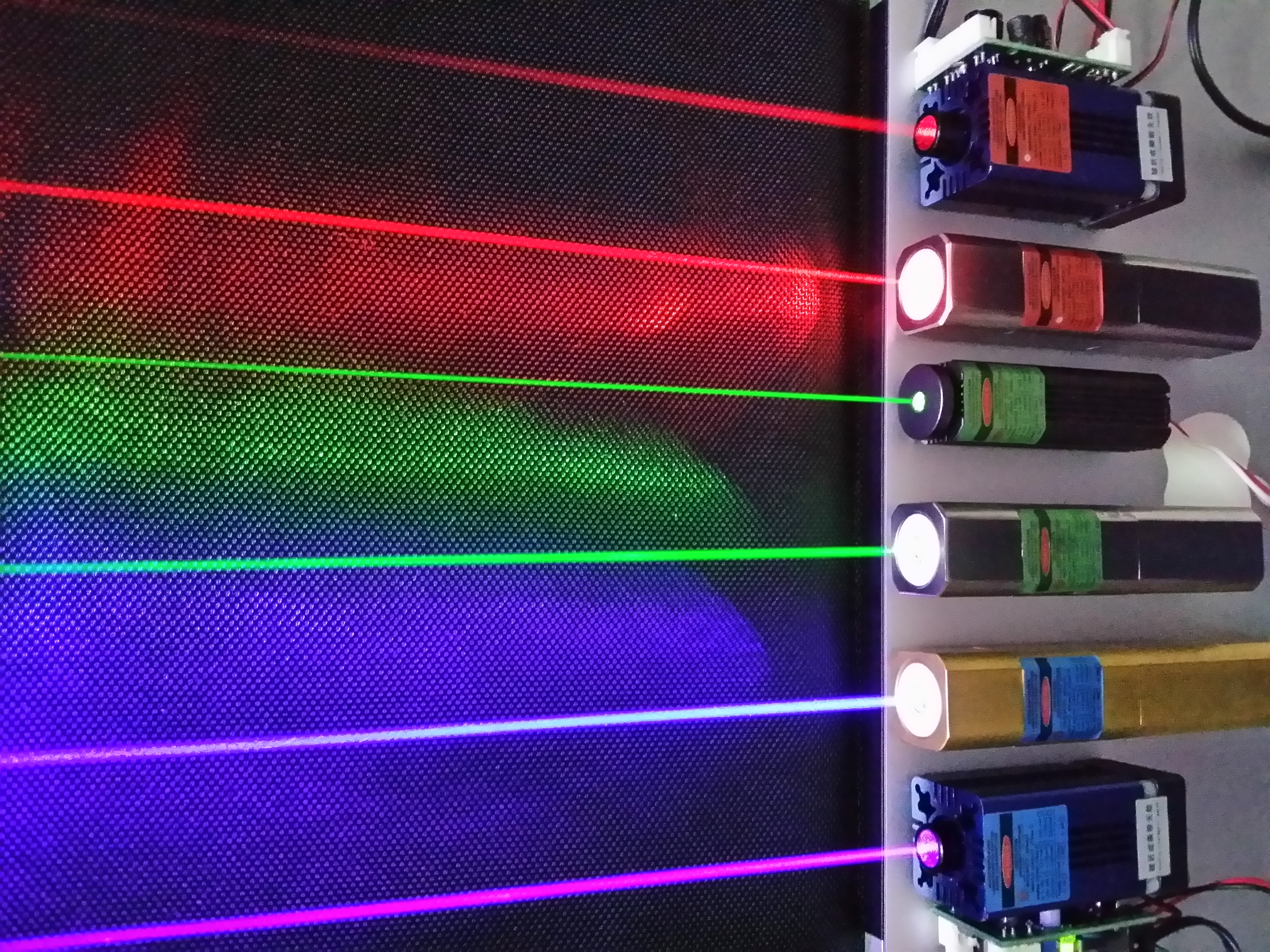
Lasers

- Laser – Device that emits light via optical amplification
  - Gas dynamic laser – Laser based on differences in relaxation velocities of molecular vibrational states
  - Gas laser – Laser in which electricity is discharged through gas
  - Ion laser – Type of gas laser
  - Laser diode – Semiconductor laser
  - Metal-vapor laser
  - Quantum dot laser – Semiconductor laser that uses quantum dots as the active laser medium
  - Quantum well laser – Laser diode in which the active region is so narrow that quantum confinement occurs
  - Ruby laser – Solid-state laser
  - Solid-state laser – Laser which uses a solid gain medium

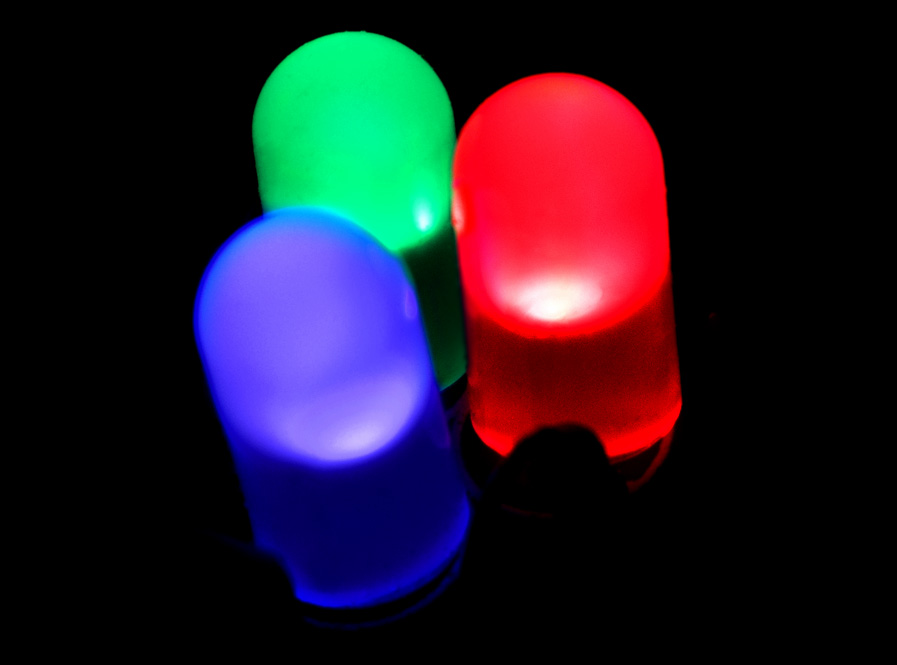
Light-emitting diodes

- Light-emitting diode (LED) – Semiconductor light source
- Light-emitting electrochemical cell – Light generation methodology
- Organic LED (OLED) – Diode that emits light from an organic compound (e.g., active matrix OLED (AMOLED), polymer LED (PLED))

==== Electric discharge ====
Electric discharge (also termed gas-discharge) is the passage of an electric current through gases and vapours by the production and movements of charge carriers under the influence of an electric field. The ionized gas becomes a plasma. Such light sources exhibit electroluminescence; some may additionally exhibit photoluminescence (e.g., fluorescent lamps due to phosphors) and/or incandescence (e.g., flashtubes due to high temperatures).

The following electric discharge sources exhibit electrostatic discharge:

- Flashtube – Incoherent light source
- Lightning – Weather phenomenon involving electrostatic discharge
- Electric spark – Abrupt electrical discharge through an ionised channel

The following list of electric discharge sources includes examples of gas-discharge or glow discharge lamps. To keep the list reasonably short, sources with only a small portion of optical radiation in the visible region (e.g., blacklight, excimer lamp, tanning lamp) and obsolete sources (e.g., Dekatron, Geissler tube, Moore lamp, Ruhmkorff lamp) are not listed.

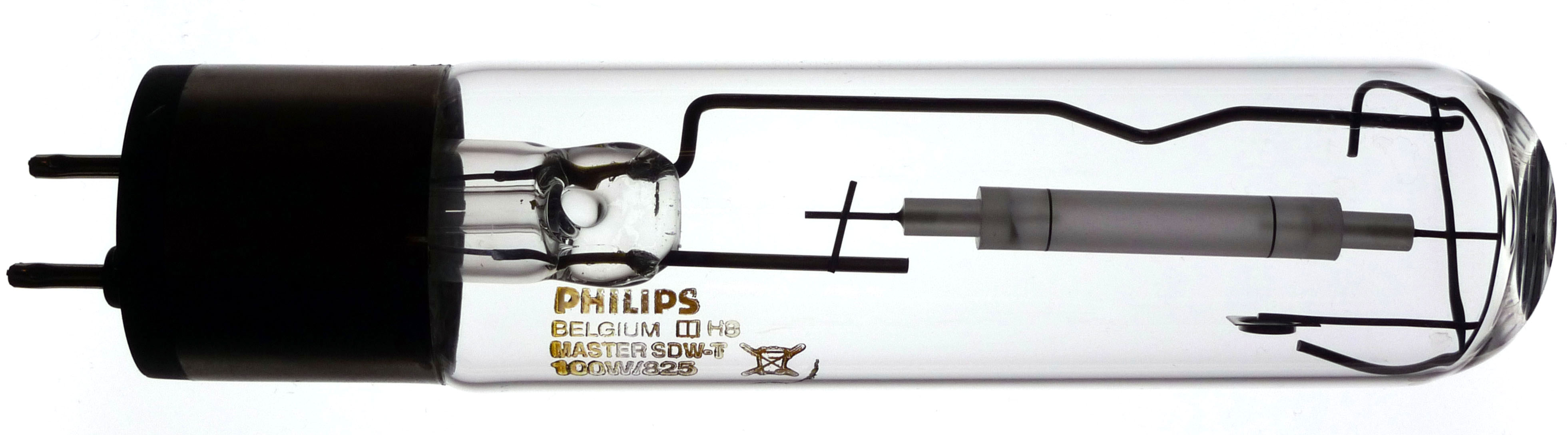
High-intensity discharge lamp

- High-intensity discharge lamp – Type of electric lamp/bulb
  - Mercury-vapor lamp – Light source using an electric arc through mercury vapor
  - Metal-halide lamp – Type of lamp
  - Sodium-vapor lamp – Type of electric gas-discharge lamp
- Hollow-cathode lamp – Types of cold cathode lamp
- Induction lighting – Gas-discharge lamp using induction to excite the gas inside
- Neon and argon lamps – Light source based on gas discharge (e.g., Nixie tube)
- Plasma lamp – Type of electrodeless gas-discharge lamp

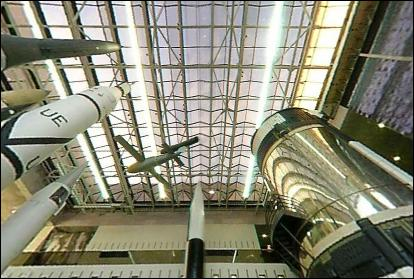
Sulfur lamps

- St. Elmo's fire – Luminous plasma created in an electric field
- Sulfur lamp – Lighting system
- Xenon arc lamp – Gas discharge lamp that produces intense white light

=== Fluorescence and phosphorescence ===
Fluorescence and phosphorescence are typically associated with photoluminescence, but can apply to other kinds of luminescence (e.g., electroluminescence, radioluminescence) as well.

==== Fluorescence ====
Fluorescence has traditionally been defined as luminescence which essentially occurs only during the irradiation of a substance by electromagnetic radiation. Any delay is typically limited to about 10 nanoseconds. However, some kinds of fluorescence (e.g., thermally activated delayed fluorescence (TADF), triplet-triplet annihilation delayed fluorescence (TTA DF)) exhibit delays akin to phosphorescence. To more clearly distinguish it from phosphorescence, fluorescence is more specifically defined as being due to an "allowed" transition generally from an excited singlet state to a ground singlet state. For brevity, the countless types of fluorescent materials that require energy from an external source (e.g., as used in high-visibility clothing) are not listed here.

- Dye laser – Equipment using an organic dye to emit coherent light
- Fluorescent lamp – Lamp using fluorescence to produce light (e.g., compact fluorescent lamp)
- Phosphor-based LED – Semiconductor light source

==== Phosphorescence ====
Phosphorescence has traditionally been defined essentially as fluorescence except with greater duration of emission following exposure to electromagnetic radiation. However, given the overlap with delayed fluorescence, phosphorescence is more specifically defined as luminescence involving a change in spin multiplicity, typically a "forbidden" transition from excited triplet state to ground singlet state.

- Phosphorescent organic light-emitting diode (PhOLED)
- Strontium aluminate – Chemical compound
- Zinc sulfide – Inorganic compound

=== Mechanoluminescence ===
Mechanoluminescence is light resulting from mechanical stress, usually defined as being applied to a solid. Fractoluminescence, piezoluminescence, and triboluminescence are different kinds of mechanoluminescence.

- Crystalline hard candy with phosphors
- Ice
- Pressure-sensitive tape
- Quartz

=== Photoluminescence ===
Photoluminescence is light resulting from absorption of photons. The phenomenon is similar to radioluminescence, with overlapping meaning for high-energy electromagnetic radiation (e.g., gamma rays, X-rays); photoluminescent materials exhibit fluorescence, delayed fluorescence, and/or phosphorescence.

- Luminous paint – Paints that glow in the dark (some can also or instead exhibit radioluminescence)
- Optical brightener – Chemical compounds that absorb and re-emit light
- Plasma display – Type of flat-panel display

=== Pyroluminescence ===
Pyroluminescence (flame luminescence) is light emitted by a gas or vapor excited by high temperature, as in a flame. At very high temperatures the collisions of atoms can cause ionization (and recombination), in which case luminescence and incandescence become indistinguishable.

- Flame test – Process in chemistry to detect certain elements

=== Radioluminescence and scintillation ===
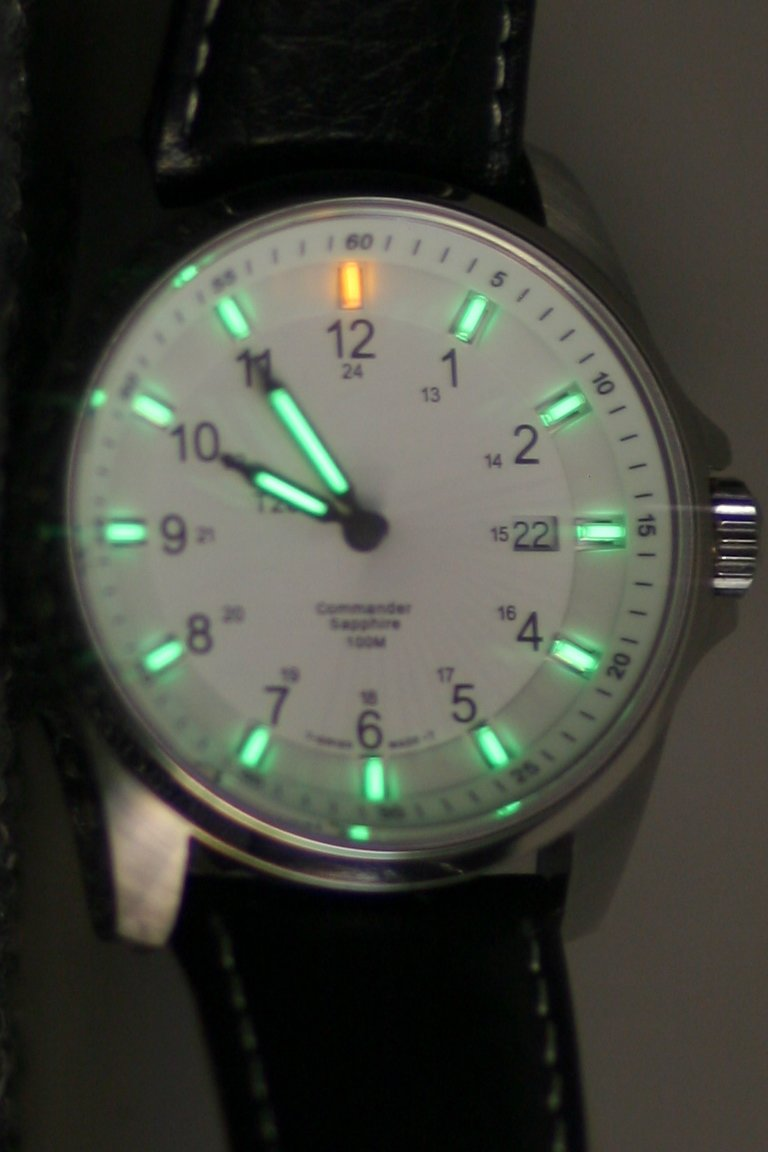
Radioluminescent

Radioluminescence, also termed scintillation, is luminescence arising from excitation by high-energy particles or radiation. The phenomenon is similar to photoluminescence, with overlapping meaning for high-energy electromagnetic radiation (e.g., gamma rays, X-rays); scintillators exhibit fluorescence, delayed fluorescence, and/or phosphorescence.

- Aurora – Atmospheric effect caused by the solar wind
- Fluoroscopy – Production of an image when X-rays strike a fluorescent screen
- Radium dial – Instrument dials painted with radium-based paint
- Scintillation counter – Instrument for measuring ionizing radiation
- Tritium radioluminescence – Use of gaseous tritium to create visible light

=== Sonoluminescence ===
Sonoluminescence is luminescence induced by sound waves, such as light emission resulting from imploding bubbles in a liquid.

- Mantis shrimp – Order of crustaceans
- Pistol shrimp – Family of crustacean possessing asymmetrical snapping claws

=== Thermoluminescence ===
Thermoluminescence is luminescence resulting from an increase in temperature that releases trapped energy from a chemical reaction or previously absorbed radiation.

- Calcite – Calcium carbonate mineral
- Crystal oscillator – Electronic oscillator circuit
- Fluorite – Mineral form of calcium fluoride

=== Other kinds of luminescence ===
Not all terms for different kinds of luminescence end in luminescence, or even orescence. Some additional types of luminescence (e.g., Bremsstrahlung, cyclotron radiation, synchrotron radiation) involve acceleration of charged particles, including but not limited to electrons; notably, this can occur in a vacuum free of atoms. Cherenkov radiation is created when a charged particle moves faster than light in a given medium (not a vacuum), similar to a sonic boom.

- Annihilation – Collision of a particle and its antiparticle
- Free-electron laser – Laser using electron beam in vacuum as gain medium (via synchrotron light source)

== Combined incandescence and luminescence ==
Light sources often exhibit both incandescence and luminescence.

- Carbon arc lamp – Lamp that produces light by an electric arc
- Nuclear reaction – Transformation of a nuclide to another

=== Exothermic chemical reactions ===
Combustion is an exothermic chemical reaction that may or may not produce a flame or explosion. A flame provides visible evidence of combustion. Whereas incomplete combustion of methane can produce soot with a temperature sufficient to incandesce (giving the flame an orangish-white color), its complete combustion yields the characteristic blue flame via luminescence, as can be demonstrated by adjusting a Bunsen burner. Methane burns in air at about 1,957 °C (2,230 K; 3,555 °F); a much higher temperature would be required to yield blackbody radiation with a similar bluish appearance.

==== Combustion-based lamps ====
- Argand lamp – Oil lamp with a gravity feed
- Carbide lamp – Acetylene-burning lamps
- Coleman lantern – Series of pressure lamps
- Betty lamp – Oil or grease burning lamp originating from Europe
- Butter lamp – Lamps traditionally burning clarified yak butter
- Flash-lamp – Electrically ignited photographic light source
- Gas lighting – Types of lighting device which burn gas fuel
- Gas mantle – Device for generating bright light when heated by a flame
- Kerosene lamp – Type of lighting device that uses kerosene as a fuel
- Lantern – Portable lighting devices
- Limelight – Type of stage lighting once used in theatres and music halls
- Oil lamp – Lamp used for lighting by burning oil
- Tilley lamp – Pressurized kerosene lamps made by the Tilley company in the UK

==== Other combustion-based light sources ====
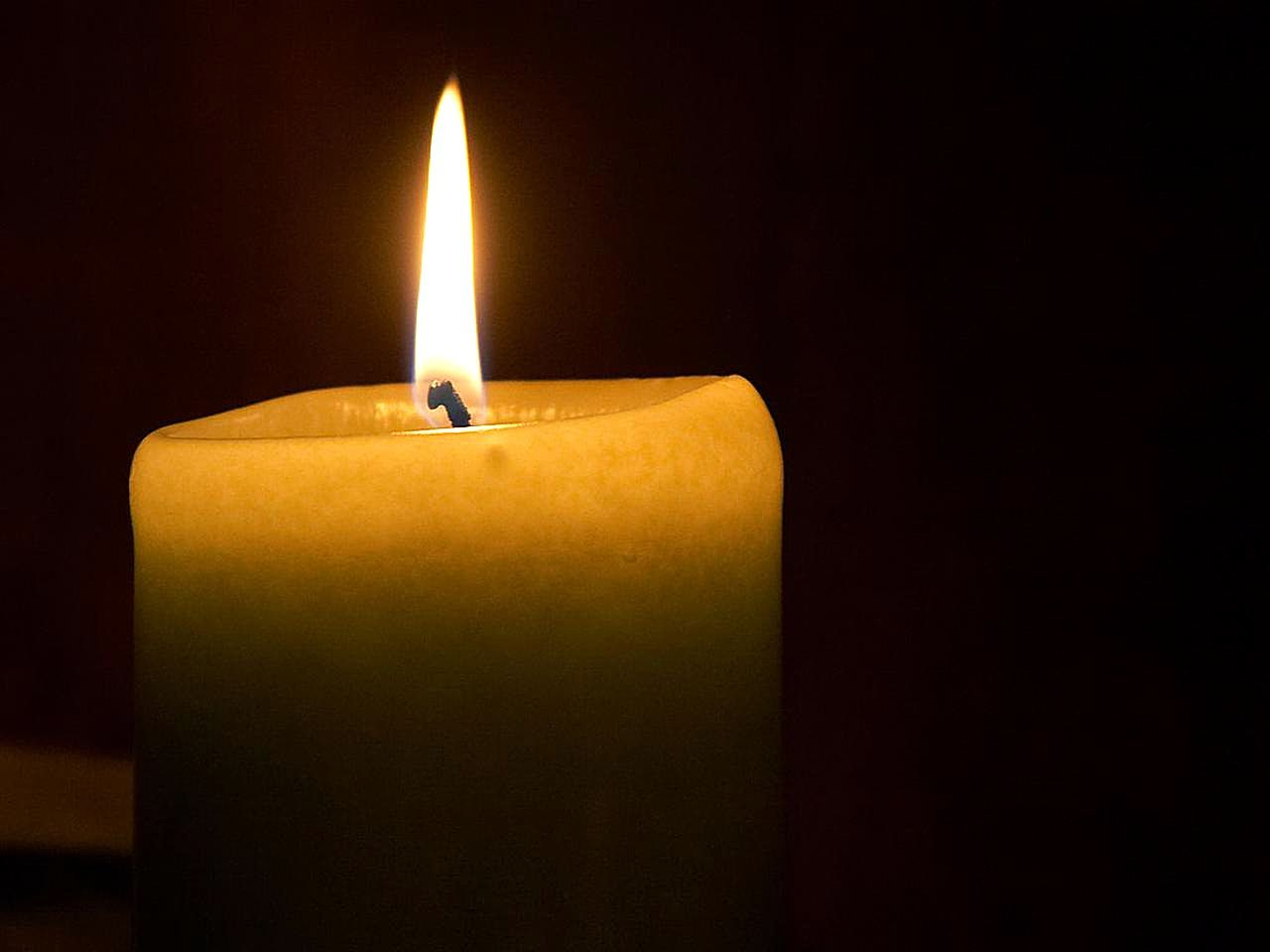
Candle

Light sources associated with flames (e.g., braziers, flamethrowers, muzzle flashes, persistent natural fires) and pyrotechnics are limitless in number; those not used specifically to produce light are not listed.

- Argon flash – Single-use source of very short and extremely bright flash of light
- Candle – Wick embedded in solid flammable substance
- Ember – Hot lump of slowly burning solid fuel
- Fire – Rapid and hot oxidation of a material
- Fireworks – Low explosive pyrotechnic devices for entertainment
- Rubens tube – Physics apparatus for demonstrating acoustic standing waves in a tube
- Torch – Stick with a flaming end used as a source of light

== See also ==
- All of the Lights – Kanye West single whose lyrics name multiple light sources
- Electric light – Device for producing light from electricity
- Light fixture – Electrical device with an electric lamp
- List of reflected light sources
- Luminous efficacy – How efficiently a source produces visible light
- Photometry (optics) – Measurement of visible light
