= Ceravision =

- Company type: Private
- Industry: Lighting
- Founded: United Kingdom
- Headquarters: Milton Keynes, United Kingdom
- Products: High Efficiency Plasma (HEP) lighting ionCORE range

Ceravision is a privately owned lighting company based in Milton Keynes, UK. Ceravision is the inventor of High Efficiency Plasma (HEP) lighting technology, a new and unique genre of electrodeless lamps, driven by radio frequency (RF) and particularly suited to medium and high power commercial applications.

HEP lighting technology is ideally suited for a number of high-output commercial lighting applications. Ceravision has exploited the ability to use various doses to efficiently deliver tailored spectra for particular applications. The company has launched an HEP plasma grow-light for the horticulture and hydroponics markets that delivers the blue-light, UV-A and UV-B missing from most available grow-light spectrums in the market. However, HEP plasma lighting technology lends itself to several other high-output applications including lighting for: reptile houses; artificial coral growth; insect breeding; TV film and studio; and ultra-violet (UV-C) water sterilisation.

== Electrodeless lamp ==
Electrodeless lamps have been recognized, since Nikola Tesla filed a patent in 1894, as having a number of advantages:

- No electrodes to break - so potentially very long life
- No chemical degradation of the electrodes - so much lower lumen loss and discoloration during life
- No reactive chemicals in the light engine to cause material stress and reduced life.

The inherent problems with constraining the radio waves within the lamp and minimising RF power have been successfully overcome.

== Developments ==
Earlier incarnations, such as the sulfur lamp, had been very large. The invention took advantage of the high dielectric constant of ceramic to create a very small waveguide to constrain and focus the radio waves. Though the resulting lamp was small and produced a large number of lumens per watt at the bulb, the lamp efficiency was low since 80-85% of the light generated is trapped inside the opaque ceramic waveguide.

Ceravision's invention was a clear quartz waveguide and integrated lamp, which forms a single piece construction. The generated light can now be collected because the waveguide is optically clear, giving excellent lamp lumens per watt. The integrated burner and waveguide, which is source of light, is very small meaning that it is possible to design exceptionally efficient luminaires. HID (high intensity discharge) luminaires have typical utilization efficiencies of 75%. Fluorescent lamp luminaires have efficiencies of 70% - meaning that 25% and 30% respectively of the light produced by the lamp is wasted. The ionCORE range has utilization efficiencies of more than 90%. The burner is integrated into the thick walled quartz waveguide, high powers from 100 - 5000W's are possible without damage to the lamp.

The second issue - long life, low cost RF generation has been solved using a combination of a magnetron with a specialized controller. Magnetrons are manufactured in large volumes for use in microwave ovens and are able to produce RF power at low cost.

The historic problem with magnetrons had been their short life (the life of a microwave magnetron was typically c.2,000 hours). Ceravision has developed a method of extending the life of magnetrons to over 40,000 hours. Ceravision has an agreement with Toshiba to develop high efficiency magnetrons.

The lamp consists of four integrated elements; a quartz RF resonator and integral plasma burner (lamp), a transition unit (the system which couples the RF source to the resonator), a magnetron, and an AC power supply. The resonator and integrated burner contain an inert gas and metal halide salts. Microwave energy ionizes the gas to form the plasma which combines with the metal halide to vaporize the metal halide salts and produce the light.

== See also ==
- Luxim
