= Energy saving lamp =

Low-power electric lighting

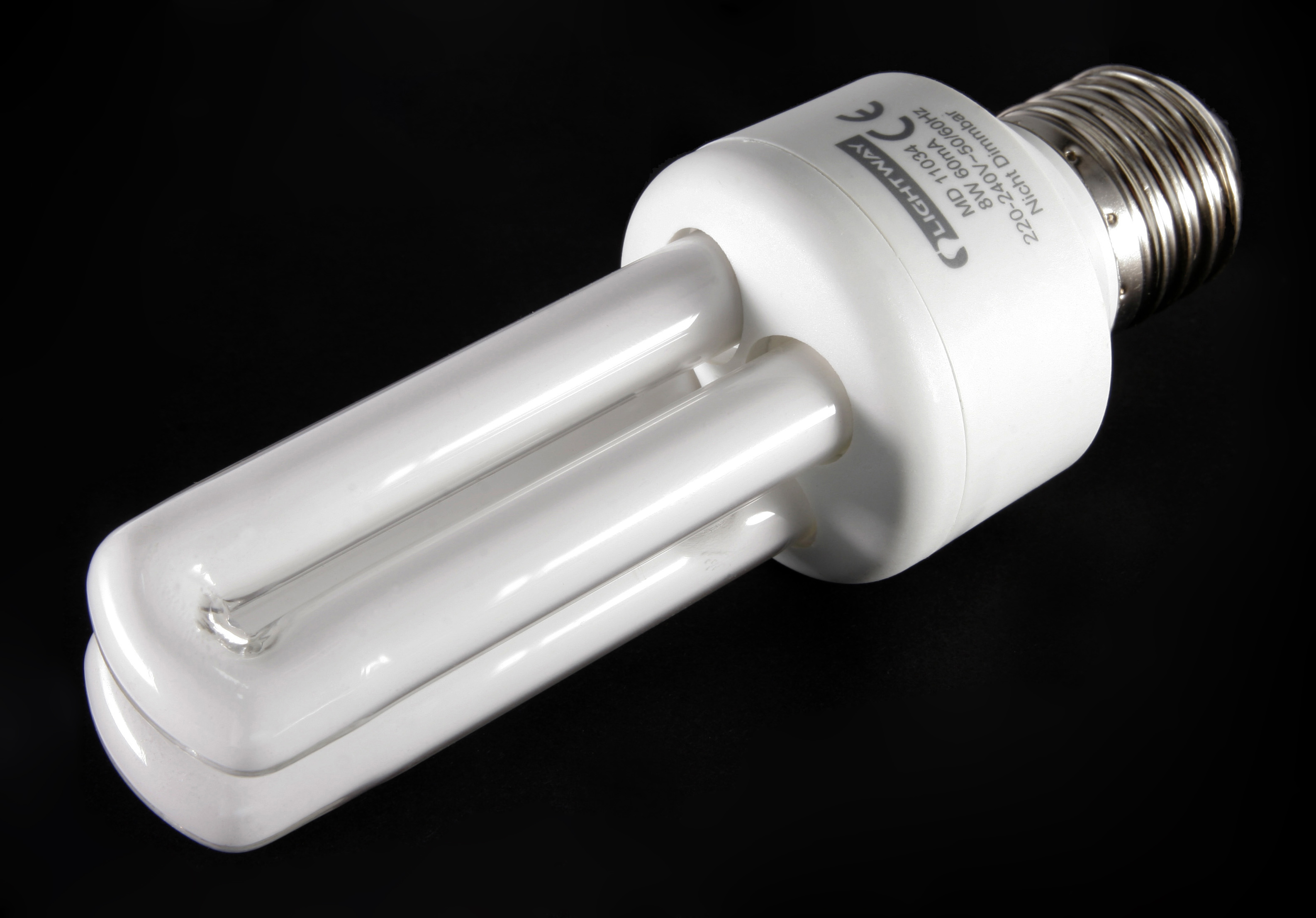
Energy saving lamp

Energy saving lamps are sources of artificial light that employ advanced technology to reduce the amount of electricity used to generate light, relative to traditional filament-burning light bulbs. Despite using less energy they emit almost the same amount of lumens.

Examples of energy saving lamps include:

- Fluorescent lamps; i.e. regular and compact
- LED lamp
- a Light-emitting electrochemical cell
- Magnetic induction lamps

== See also ==
- Energy law
- Luminous efficacy
