= Luminescence =

Spontaneous emission of light by a substance

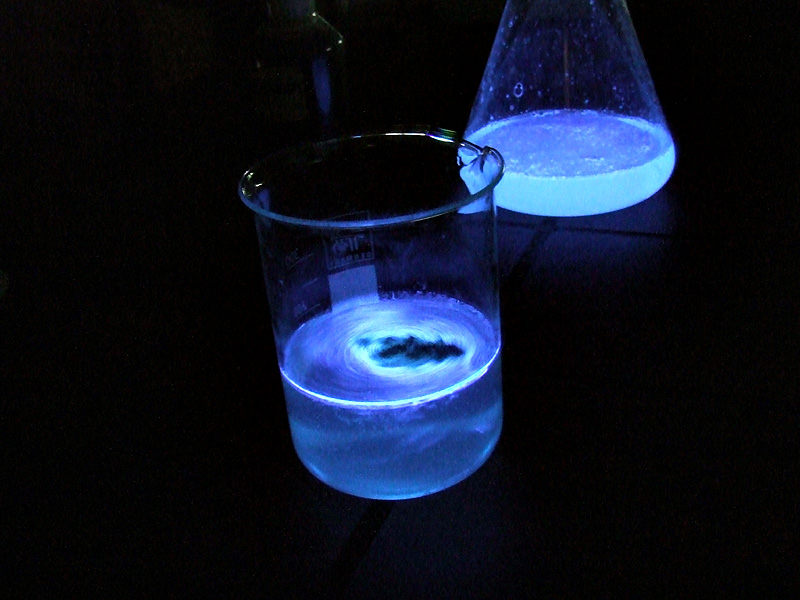
Luminol and haemoglobin, an example of chemiluminescence

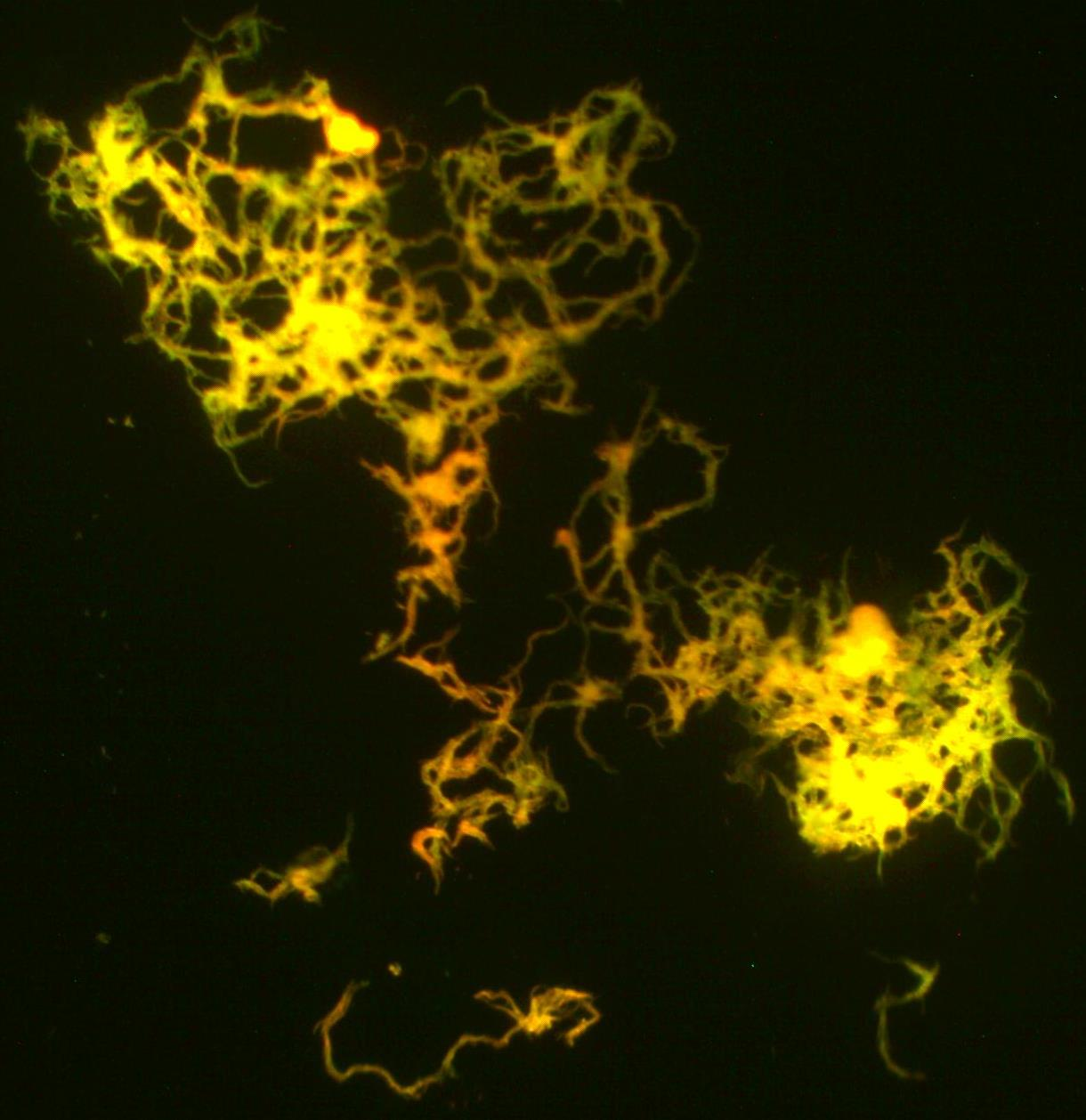
UV-photoluminescence in microbiological diagnostics

Luminescence can be simply defined as any emission of visible electromagnetic radiation (light) not ascribable directly to incandescence. Incandescence emerges at high temperatures due to thermal radiation; in contrast, because luminescence is often independent of temperature, it is sometimes termed cold light. However, some kinds of luminescence (e.g., candoluminescence, pyroluminescence, thermoluminescence) are associated with or require elevated temperatures. Notably, luminescence is exhibited by primary light sources (which emit light) rather than by secondary light sources (which reflect or transmit light).

Luminescence has also been defined to include all optical radiation, rather than being limited to visible radiation. In addition, it has been defined as a spontaneous emission of radiation from an electronically or vibrationally excited species not in thermal equilibrium with its environment.

== Types ==
- Candoluminescence, is light emitted by certain materials at elevated temperatures, which differs from the blackbody emission expected at the temperature in question.
- Cathodoluminescence, a result of a luminescent material being struck by electrons
- Chemiluminescence, the emission of light as a result of a chemical reaction
  - Bioluminescence, a result of biochemical reactions in a living organism
  - Electrochemiluminescence, a result of an electrochemical reaction
  - Lyoluminescence, a result of dissolving a solid (usually heavily irradiated) in a liquid solvent
- Cryoluminescence, the emission of light when a material (e.g., nanomaterials, wulfenite, zinc sulfide phosphors) is cooled
- Crystalloluminescence, produced during crystallization
- Electroluminescence, a result of an electric current passed through a substance
- Fluorescence, traditionally defined as the emission of light that ends immediately after the source of excitation is removed. As the definition does not fully describe the phenomenon, quantum mechanics is employed where it is defined as there is no change in spin multiplicity from the state of excitation to emission of light.
- Galvanoluminescence, a result of passage of an electric current through an electrolyte in which an electrode is immersed
- Ionoluminescence, a result of bombardment by fast ions
- Mechanoluminescence, a result of a mechanical action on a solid
  - Triboluminescence, generated when bonds in a material are broken when that material is scratched, crushed, or rubbed
  - Fractoluminescence, generated when bonds in certain crystals are broken by fractures
  - Piezoluminescence, produced by the action of pressure on certain solids
- Phosphorescence, traditionally defined as persistent emission of light after the end of excitation. As the definition does not fully describe the phenomenon, quantum mechanics is employed where it is defined as there is a change in spin multiplicity from the state of excitation to the emission of light.
- Photoluminescence, a result of the absorption of photons
- Pyroluminescence (flame luminescence), a result of a gas or vapor being excited by high temperature, as in a flame
- Radioluminescence (or scintillation), a result of bombardment by ionizing radiation
- Sonoluminescence, a result of imploding bubbles in a liquid when excited by sound
- Thermoluminescence, the re-emission of absorbed energy when a substance is heated

== Applications ==
- Light-emitting diodes (LEDs) emit light via electro-luminescence.
- Phosphors, materials that emit light when irradiated by higher-energy electromagnetic radiation or particle radiation
- Laser, and lamp industry
- Phosphor thermometry, measuring temperature using phosphorescence
- Thermoluminescence dating
- Thermoluminescent dosimeter
- Non-disruptive observation of processes within a cell.

The dials, hands, scales, and signs of aviation and navigational instruments and markings are often coated with luminescent materials in a process known as luminising.

Luminescence occurs in some minerals when they are exposed to low-powered sources of ultraviolet or infrared electromagnetic radiation (for example, portable UV lamps) at atmospheric pressure and atmospheric temperatures. This property of these minerals can be used during the process of mineral identification at rock outcrops in the field or in the laboratory.

An industrial application of X-ray luminescence is its use in the automated sorting of diamonds. To improve the recovery of diamonds with weak or anomalous luminescence, their surface can be modified with a luminophore-containing agent. This treatment enhances their X-ray luminescence signal, making them detectable by the sorting machine and significantly increasing recovery rates.

== History ==
The term luminescence was first introduced in 1888 by German physicist Eilhard Wiedemann.

== See also ==
- List of light sources
- High-visibility clothing
