= Sonoluminescence =

Luminescence induced by sound waves

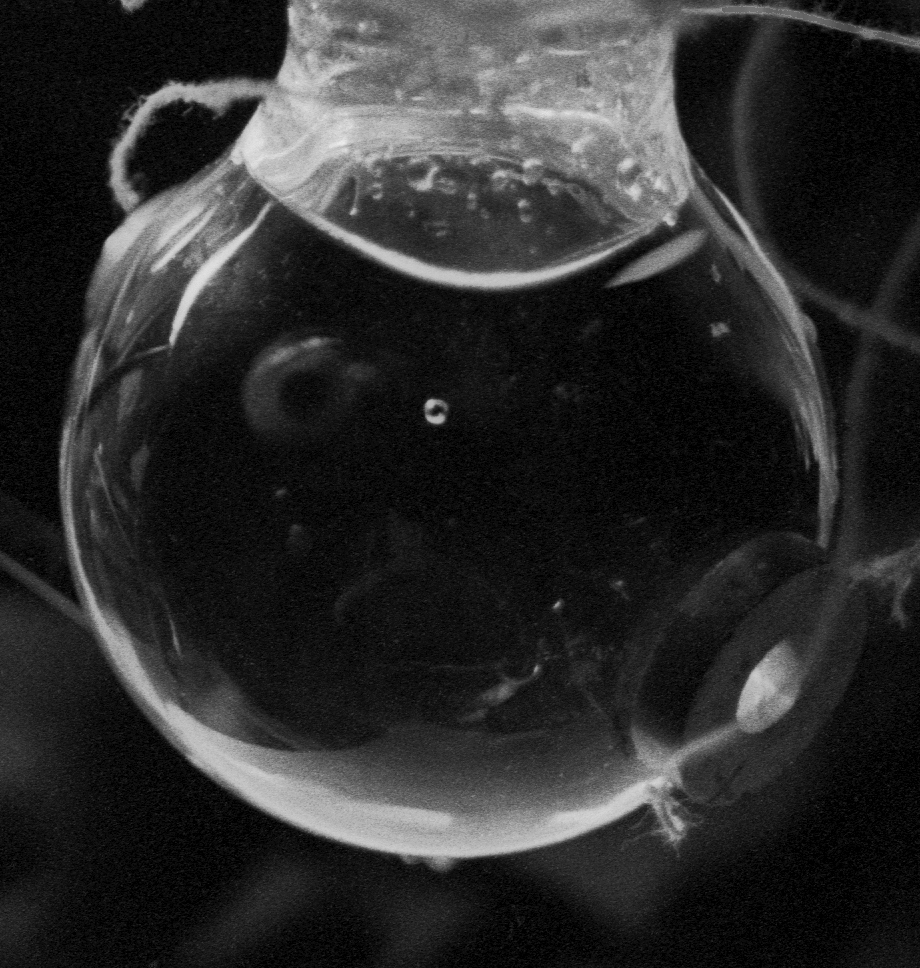
Single-bubble sonoluminescence – a single, cavitating bubble

Sonoluminescence is luminescence induced by sound waves, such as in the emission of light from imploding bubbles in a liquid when excited by sound. Sonoluminescence is sometimes considered a kind of mechanoluminescence. However, mechanoluminescence is typically defined as pertaining to solids, while sonoluminescence usually pertains to liquids. The related terms acoustoluminescence and sonotriboluminescence have been used to describe sound-induced luminescence in solids (e.g., crystals suspended in slurries).

Sonoluminescence was first discovered in 1934 at the University of Cologne. It occurs when a sound wave of sufficient intensity induces a gaseous cavity within a liquid to collapse quickly, emitting a burst of light. The phenomenon can be observed in stable single-bubble sonoluminescence (SBSL) and multi-bubble sonoluminescence (MBSL). In 1960, Peter Jarman proposed that sonoluminescence is thermal in origin and might arise from microshocks within collapsing cavities. Later experiments revealed that the temperature inside the bubble during SBSL could reach up to 12,000 kelvins (11,700 °C; 21,100 °F). The exact mechanism behind sonoluminescence remains unknown, with various hypotheses including hotspot, bremsstrahlung, and collision-induced radiation. Some researchers have even speculated that temperatures in sonoluminescing systems could reach more than a million Kelvin, potentially causing thermonuclear fusion; this idea, however, has been met with skepticism by other researchers. The phenomenon has also been observed in nature, with the pistol shrimp being the first known instance of an animal producing light through sonoluminescence.

== History ==
The sonoluminescence effect was first discovered at the University of Cologne in 1934 as a result of work on sonar. Hermann Frenzel and H. Schultes put an ultrasound transducer in a tank of photographic developer fluid. They hoped to speed up the development process. Instead, they noticed tiny dots on the film after developing and realized that the bubbles in the fluid were emitting light with the ultrasound turned on. It was too difficult to analyze the effect in early experiments because of the complex environment of a large number of short-lived bubbles. This phenomenon is now referred to as multi-bubble sonoluminescence (MBSL).

In 1960, Peter Jarman from Imperial College of London proposed the most reliable theory of sonoluminescence phenomenon. He concluded that sonoluminescence is basically thermal in origin and that it might possibly arise from microshocks with the collapsing cavities.

In 1990, an experimental advance was reported by Gaitan and Crum, who produced stable single-bubble sonoluminescence (SBSL). In SBSL, a single bubble trapped in an acoustic standing wave emits a pulse of light with each compression of the bubble within the standing wave. This technique allowed a more systematic study of the phenomenon because it isolated the complex effects into one stable, predictable bubble. It was realized that the temperature inside the bubble was hot enough to melt steel, as seen in an experiment done in 2012; the temperature inside the bubble as it collapsed reached about 12,000 K (11,700 °C; 21,100 °F). Interest in sonoluminescence was renewed when an inner temperature of such a bubble well above 1 MK (999,727 °C; 1,799,540 °F) was postulated. This temperature is thus far not conclusively proven; rather, recent experiments indicate temperatures around 20,000 K (19,700 °C; 35,500 °F).

== Properties ==
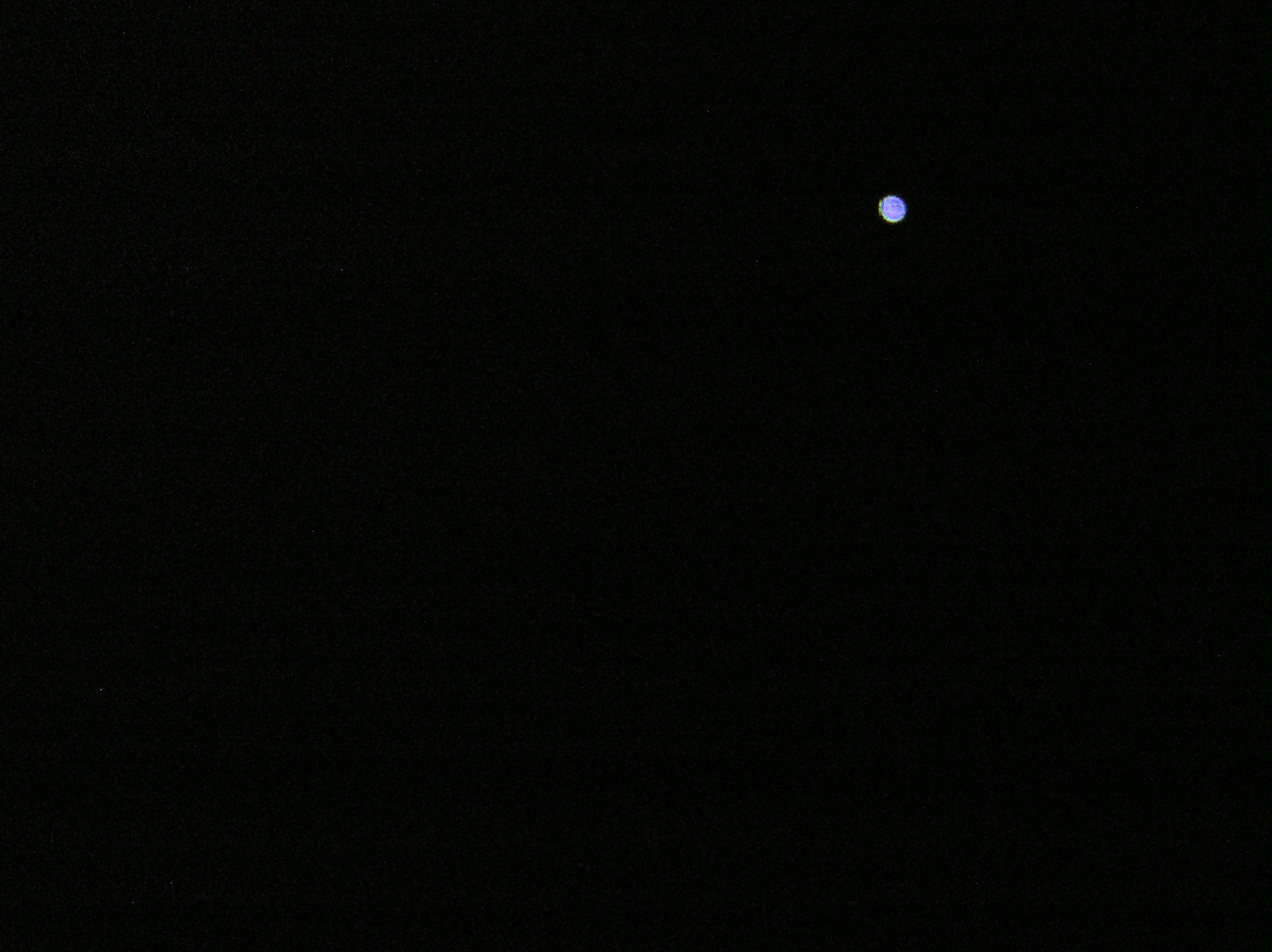
Long exposure image of MBSL created by a high-intensity ultrasonic horn immersed in a beaker of liquid

Sonoluminescence can occur when a sound wave of sufficient intensity induces a gaseous cavity within a liquid to collapse quickly. This cavity may take the form of a preexisting bubble or may be generated through a process known as cavitation. Sonoluminescence in the laboratory can be made to be stable so that a single bubble will expand and collapse over and over again in a periodic fashion, emitting a burst of light each time it collapses. For this to occur, a standing acoustic wave is set up within a liquid, and the bubble will sit at a pressure antinode of the standing wave. The frequencies of resonance depend on the shape and size of the container in which the bubble is contained.

Some facts about sonoluminescence:

- The light that flashes from the bubbles last between 35 and a few hundred picoseconds long, with peak intensities of the order of 1–10 megawatts (1,300–13,400 hp).
- The bubbles are very small when they emit light—about 1 micrometer (3.9×10^{−5} in) in diameter—depending on the ambient fluid (e.g., water) and the gas content of the bubble (e.g., atmospheric air).
- SBSL pulses can have very stable periods and positions. In fact, the frequency of light flashes can be more stable than the rated frequency stability of the oscillator making the sound waves driving them. The stability analyses of the bubble, however, show that the bubble itself undergoes significant geometric instabilities due to, for example, the Bjerknes forces and Rayleigh–Taylor instabilities.
- The addition of a small amount of noble gas (such as helium, argon, or xenon) to the gas in the bubble increases the intensity of the emitted light.

Spectral measurements have given bubble temperatures in the range from 2,300 to 5,100 K (2,030 to 4,830 °C; 3,680 to 8,720 °F), the exact temperatures depending on experimental conditions including the composition of the liquid and gas. Detection of very high bubble temperatures by spectral methods is limited due to the opacity of liquids to short wavelength light characteristic of very high temperatures.

A study describes a method of determining temperatures based on the formation of plasmas. Using argon bubbles in sulfuric acid, the data shows the presence of ionized molecular oxygen O^{+}_{2}, sulfur monoxide, and atomic argon populating high-energy excited states, which confirms a hypothesis that the bubbles have a hot plasma core. The ionization and excitation energy of dioxygenyl cations, which they observed, is 18 electronvolts (2.9×10^{−18} J). From this observation, they conclude the core temperatures reach at least 20,000 K (19,700 °C; 35,500 °F)—hotter than the surface of the Sun.

== Rayleigh–Plesset equation ==
The dynamics of the motion of the bubble is characterized to a first approximation by the Rayleigh–Plesset equation (named after Lord Rayleigh and Milton Plesset):

$$R\ddot{R} + \frac{3}{2}\dot{R}^{2} = \frac{1}{\rho}\left(P_\infty(t) - P_0(t) - 4\mu\frac{\dot{R}}{R} - \frac{2\gamma}{R}\right)$$

This is an approximate equation that is derived from the Navier–Stokes equations (written in spherical coordinate system) and describes the motion of the radius of the bubble R as a function of time t. Here, μ is the viscosity, $P_\infty(t)$ is the external pressure infinitely far from the bubble, $P_0(t)$ is the internal pressure of the bubble, $\rho$ is the liquid density, and γ is the surface tension. The over-dots represent time derivatives. This equation, though approximate, has been shown to give good estimates on the motion of the bubble under the acoustically driven field except during the final stages of collapse. Both simulation and experimental measurement show that during the critical final stages of collapse, the bubble wall velocity exceeds the speed of sound of the gas inside the bubble. Thus a more detailed analysis of the bubble's motion is needed beyond Rayleigh–Plesset to explore the additional energy focusing that an internally formed shock wave might produce. In the static case, the Rayleigh-Plesset equation simplifies, yielding the Young–Laplace equation.

== Mechanism of phenomena ==
The mechanism of the phenomenon of sonoluminescence is unknown. Hypotheses include: hotspot, bremsstrahlung radiation, collision-induced radiation and corona discharges, nonclassical light, proton tunneling, electrodynamic jets and fractoluminescent jets (now largely discredited due to contrary experimental evidence).

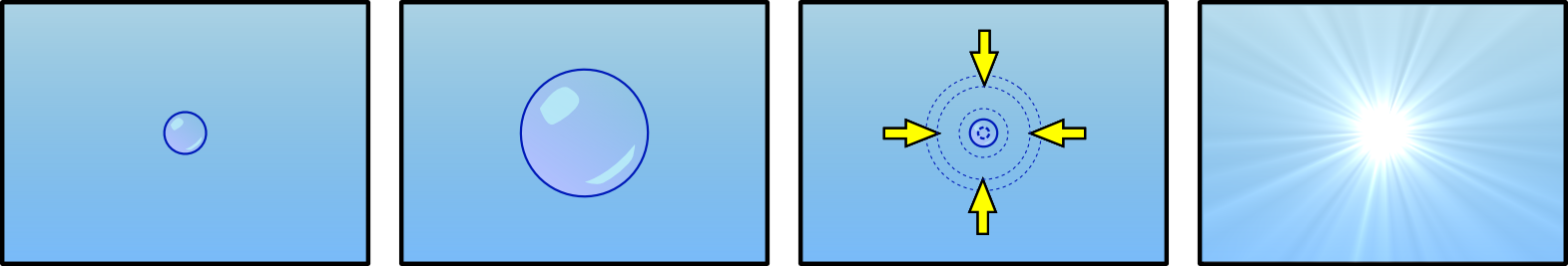
From left to right: apparition of bubble, slow expansion, quick and sudden contraction, emission of light

In 2002, M. Brenner, S. Hilgenfeldt, and D. Lohse published a 60-page review that contains a detailed explanation of the mechanism. An important factor is that the bubble contains mainly inert noble gas such as argon or xenon (air contains about 1% argon, and the amount dissolved in water is too great; for sonoluminescence to occur, the concentration must be reduced to 20–40% of its equilibrium value) and varying amounts of water vapor. Chemical reactions cause nitrogen and oxygen to be removed from the bubble after about one hundred expansion-collapse cycles. The bubble will then begin to emit light. The light emission of highly compressed noble gas is exploited technologically in the argon flash devices.

During bubble collapse, the inertia of the surrounding water causes high pressure and high temperature, reaching around 10,000 kelvins in the interior of the bubble, causing the ionization of a small fraction of the noble gas present. The amount ionized is small enough for the bubble to remain transparent, allowing volume emission; surface emission would produce more intense light of longer duration, dependent on wavelength, contradicting experimental results. Electrons from ionized atoms interact mainly with neutral atoms, causing thermal bremsstrahlung radiation. As the wave hits a low energy trough, the pressure drops, allowing electrons to recombine with atoms and light emission to cease due to this lack of free electrons. This makes for a 160-picosecond light pulse for argon (even a small drop in temperature causes a large drop in ionization, due to the large ionization energy relative to photon energy). This description is simplified from the literature above, which details various steps of differing duration from 15 microseconds (expansion) to 100 picoseconds (emission).

Computations based on the theory presented in the review produce radiation parameters (intensity and duration time versus wavelength) that match experimental results with errors no larger than expected due to some simplifications (e.g., assuming a uniform temperature in the entire bubble), so it seems the phenomenon of sonoluminescence is at least roughly explained, although some details of the process remain obscure.

Any discussion of sonoluminescence must include a detailed analysis of metastability. Sonoluminescence in this respect is what is physically termed a bounded phenomenon meaning that the sonoluminescence exists in a bounded region of parameter space for the bubble; a coupled magnetic field being one such parameter. The magnetic aspects of sonoluminescence are very well documented.

=== Other proposals ===
==== Quantum explanations ====
An unusually exotic hypothesis of sonoluminescence, which has received much popular attention, is the Casimir energy hypothesis suggested by noted physicist Julian Schwinger and more thoroughly considered in a paper by Claudia Eberlein of the University of Sussex. Eberlein's paper suggests that the light in sonoluminescence is generated by the vacuum within the bubble in a process similar to Hawking radiation, the radiation generated at the event horizon of black holes. According to this vacuum energy explanation, since quantum theory holds that vacuum contains virtual particles, the rapidly moving interface between water and gas converts virtual photons into real photons. This is related to the Unruh effect or the Casimir effect. The argument has been made that sonoluminescence releases too large an amount of energy and releases the energy on too short a time scale to be consistent with the vacuum energy explanation, although other credible sources argue the vacuum energy explanation might yet prove to be correct.

==== Nuclear reactions ====
Some have argued that the Rayleigh–Plesset equation described above is unreliable for predicting bubble temperatures and that actual temperatures in sonoluminescing systems can be far higher than 20,000 kelvins. Some research claims to have measured temperatures as high as 100,000 kelvins and speculates temperatures could reach into the millions of kelvins. Temperatures this high could cause thermonuclear fusion. This possibility is sometimes referred to as bubble fusion and is likened to the implosion design used in the fusion component of thermonuclear weapons.

Experiments in 2002 and 2005 by R. P. Taleyarkhan using deuterated acetone showed measurements of tritium and neutron output consistent with fusion. However, the papers were considered low quality and there were doubts cast by a report about the author's scientific misconduct. This made the report lose credibility among the scientific community.

On January 27, 2006, researchers at Rensselaer Polytechnic Institute in collaboration with Taleyarkin claimed to have produced fusion in sonoluminescence experiments.

== Biological sonoluminescence ==
Pistol shrimp (also called snapping shrimp) produce a type of cavitation luminescence from a collapsing bubble caused by quickly snapping its claw. The animal snaps a specialized claw shut to create a cavitation bubble that generates acoustic pressures of up to 80 kPa at a distance of 4 cm from the claw. As it extends out from the claw, the bubble reaches speeds of 60 miles per hour (97 km/h) and releases a sound reaching 218 decibels. The pressure is strong enough to kill small fish. The light produced is of lower intensity than the light produced by typical sonoluminescence and is not visible to the naked eye. The light and heat produced by the bubble may have no direct significance, as it is the shockwave produced by the rapidly collapsing bubble which these shrimp use to stun or kill prey. However, it is the first known instance of an animal producing light by this effect and was whimsically dubbed "shrimpoluminescence" upon its discovery in 2001. It has subsequently been discovered that another group of crustaceans, the mantis shrimp, contains species whose club-like forelimbs can strike so quickly and with such force as to induce sonoluminescent cavitation bubbles upon impact.

A mechanical device with 3D printed snapper claw at five times the actual size was also reported to emit light in a similar fashion, this bioinspired design was based on the snapping shrimp snapper claw molt shed from an Alpheus formosus, the striped snapping shrimp.

== See also ==
- List of light sources
- Seth Putterman
- Sonochemistry
- Triboluminescence
