= Triboluminescence =

Mechanical generation of light

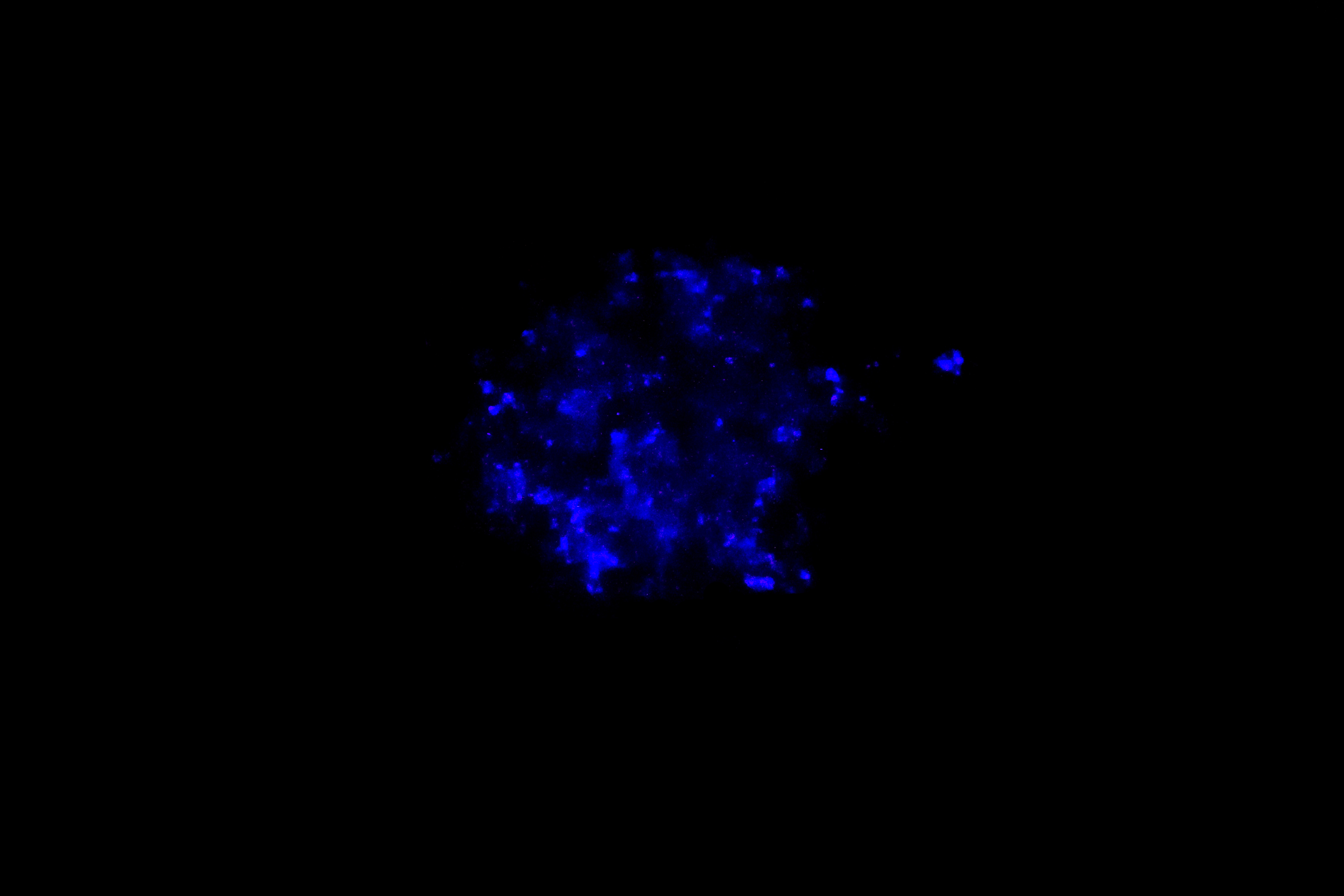
Triboluminescence of nicotine L-salicylate

Triboluminescence is a phenomenon in which light is generated when a material is mechanically pulled apart, ripped, scratched, crushed, or rubbed (see tribology). The phenomenon is not fully understood but appears in most cases to be caused by the separation and reunification of static electric charges, see also triboelectric effect. The term comes from the Greek τρίβειν ("to rub"; see tribology) and the Latin lumen (light). Triboluminescence can be observed when breaking sugar crystals and peeling adhesive tapes.

Triboluminescence is often a synonym for fractoluminescence (a term mainly used when referring only to light emitted from fractured crystals). Triboluminescence differs from piezoluminescence in that a piezoluminescent material emits light when deformed, as opposed to broken. These are examples of mechanoluminescence, which is luminescence resulting from any mechanical action on a solid.

== History ==
=== Early scientific reports ===
The first recorded observation is attributed to English scholar Francis Bacon when he recorded in his 1620 Novum Organum that "It is well known that all sugar, whether candied or plain, if it be hard, will sparkle when broken or scraped in the dark." The scientist Robert Boyle also reported on some of his work on triboluminescence in 1663. In 1675, astronomer Jean-Felix Picard observed that his barometer was glowing in the dark as he carried it. His barometer consisted of a glass tube that was partially filled with mercury. The empty space above the mercury would glow whenever the mercury slid down the glass tube.

In the late 1790s, sugar production began to produce more refined sugar crystals. These crystals were formed into a large solid cone for transport and sale. This solid sugar cone had to be broken into usable chunks using a sugar nips device. People began to notice that tiny bursts of light were visible as sugar was "nipped" in low light, an established example of triboluminescence.

== Mechanism of action ==
There remain a few ambiguities about the effect. The current theory of triboluminescence—based upon crystallographic, spectroscopic, and other experimental evidence—is that upon fracture of asymmetrical materials, charge is separated. When the charges recombine, the electrical discharge ionizes the surrounding air, causing a flash of light. Research further suggests that crystals that display triboluminescence often lack symmetry and are poor conductors. However, there are substances which break this rule, and which do not possess asymmetry, yet display triboluminescence, such as hexakis(antipyrine)terbium iodide. It is thought that these materials contain impurities, which make the substance locally asymmetric. Further information on some of the possible processes involved can be found in the page on the triboelectric effect.

The biological phenomenon of triboluminescence is thought to be controlled by recombination of free radicals during mechanical activation.

== Examples ==
=== In common materials ===
Triboluminescence in quartz

Certain household materials and substances can be seen to exhibit the property:

- Ordinary pressure-sensitive tape ("Scotch tape") displays a glowing line where the end of the tape is being pulled away from the roll. Soviet scientists observed in 1953 that unpeeling a roll of tape in a vacuum produced X-rays. The mechanism of X-ray generation was studied further in 2008. Similar X-ray emissions have also been observed with metals.
- Opening an envelope sealed with polymer glue may generate light that can be viewed as blue flashes in darkness.
- When sugar crystals are crushed, tiny electrical fields are created, separating positive and negative charges that create sparks while trying to reunite. Wint-O-Green Life Savers work especially well for creating such sparks, because wintergreen oil (methyl salicylate) is fluorescent and converts ultraviolet light into blue light.

A diamond may begin to glow while being rubbed; this occasionally happens to diamonds while a facet is being ground or the diamond is being sawn during the cutting process. Diamonds may fluoresce blue or red. Some other minerals, such as quartz, are triboluminescent, emitting light when rubbed together.

Triboluminescence as a biological phenomenon is observed in mechanical deformation and contact electrification of epidermal surface of osseous and soft tissues, during chewing food, at friction in joints of vertebrae, during sexual intercourse, and during blood circulation.

Water jet abrasive cutting of ceramics (e.g., tiles) creates a yellow/orange glow at the point of impact of very high-speed flow.

=== Chemicals notable for their triboluminescence ===
- Europium tetrakis (dibenzoylmethide)triethylammonium emits particularly bright red flashes upon the destruction of its crystals.
- Triphenylphosphinebis(pyridine)thiocyanatocopper(I) emits a reasonably strong blue light when crystals of it are fractured. This luminescence is not as extreme as the red luminescence; however, it is still very clearly visible to the naked eye in standard settings.
- N-acetylanthranilic acid emits a deep blue light when its crystals are fractured.

== Fractoluminescence ==
Fractoluminescence is often used as a synonym for triboluminescence. It is the emission of light from the fracture (rather than rubbing) of a crystal, but fracturing often occurs with rubbing. Depending upon the atomic and molecular composition of the crystal, when the crystal fractures, a charge separation can occur, making one side of the fractured crystal positively charged and the other side negatively charged. Like in triboluminescence, if the charge separation results in a large enough electric potential, a discharge across the gap and through the bath gas between the interfaces can occur. The potential at which this occurs depends upon the dielectric properties of the bath gas.

=== EMR propagation during fracturing ===
The emission of electromagnetic radiation (EMR) during plastic deformation and crack propagation in metals and rocks has been studied. The EMR emissions from metals and alloys have also been explored and confirmed. Molotskii presented a dislocation mechanism for this type of EMR emission. In 2005, Srilakshmi and Misra reported an additional phenomenon of secondary EMR during plastic deformation and crack propagation in uncoated and metal-coated metals and alloys.

EMR during the micro-plastic deformation and crack propagation from several metals and alloys and transient magnetic field generation during necking in ferromagnetic metals were reported by Misra (1973–75), which have been confirmed and explored by several researchers. Tudik and Valuev (1980) were able to measure the EMR frequency during tensile fracture of iron and aluminum in the region 100 THz by using photomultipliers. Srilakshmi and Misra (2005a) also reported an additional phenomenon of secondary electromagnetic radiation in uncoated and metal-coated metals and alloys. If a solid material is subjected to stresses of large amplitudes, which can cause plastic deformation and fracture, emissions such as thermal, acoustic, ions, and exo-emissions occur.

==== Deformation induced EMR ====
The study of deformation is essential for the development of new materials. Deformation in metals depends on temperature, type of stress applied, strain rate, oxidation, and corrosion. Deformation-induced EMR can be divided into three categories: effects in ionic crystal materials, effects in rocks and granites, and effects in metals and alloys. EMR emission depends on the orientation of the grains in individual crystals since material properties are different in differing directions. Amplitude of the EMR pulse increases as long as the crack grows as new atomic bonds are broken, leading to EMR. The pulse starts to decay as the cracking halts. Observations from experiments showed that emitted EMR signals contain mixed frequency components.

==== Test methods to measure EMR ====
The most widely used tensile test method is used to characterize the mechanical properties of materials. From any complete tensile test record, one can obtain important information about the material's elastic properties, the character and extent of plastic deformation, yield, and tensile strengths and toughness. The information obtained from one test justifies the extensive use of tensile tests in engineering materials research. Therefore, investigations of EMR emissions are mainly based on the tensile test of the specimens. From experiments, it can be shown that tensile crack formation excites more intensive EMR than shear cracking, increasing the elasticity, strength, and loading rate during uniaxial loading increases amplitude. Poisson's ratio is a key parameter for EMR characterization during triaxial compression. If the Poisson's ratio is lower, it is harder for the material to strain transversally and hence there is a higher probability of new fractures.

== See also ==
- Earthquake light
- List of light sources
- Physical crystallography before X-rays
- Piezoelectricity
- Sonoluminescence
- Triboelectric effect
