= Crystalloluminescence =

Luminescence produced from crystallization

Crystalloluminescence is the effect of luminescence produced during crystallization, specifically during nucleation. The phenomenon was first reported in the 1800s from the rapid crystallization of potassium sulfate from an aqueous solution.

== See also ==
- Physical crystallography before X-rays
