= Betty lamp =

Oil or grease burning lamp originating from Europe

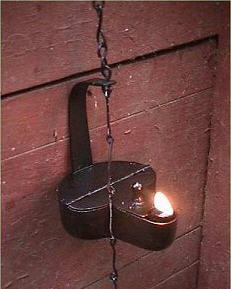

The Betty lamp is a lamp thought to be of German, Austrian, or Hungarian origin. It came into use in the 18th century. They were commonly made of iron or brass and were most often used in the home or workshop. These lamps burned fish oil or fat trimmings and had wicks of twisted cloth.

The Betty lamp differs from earlier oil/grease lamps in that it uses an internal wick holder to eliminate fuel drip common with older lamp designs. This internal wick holder feature made the Betty lamp design very popular.

The Betty lamp is likely a natural evolution of the Crusie lamp concept. The Crusie lamp consists of two lamp pans, one above the other. Fuel drip from the upper lamp pan fell into the lower pan minimizing oil/grease mess below the lamp. In the evolution to the Betty lamp, replacing the upper lamp pan with a metal wick holder inside the lower pan reduces the amount of metal needed for the lamp. Adding a top cover provides protection of the lamp's oil from insects, minimized spills and increased burning efficiency.

Betty lamps are being made today but now most people burn olive oil or other vegetable oil. They are popular with living history buffs and people living in developing countries that are lacking other resources.

Because of its association with colonial domestic activity, the Betty lamp was chosen for the symbol of the American Home Economics Association in 1926.

== See also ==
- List of light sources
