= Mechanoluminescence =

Light resulting from mechanical action on a solid

Mechanoluminescence is light emission resulting from any mechanical action on a solid.

- Fractoluminescence is caused by stress that results in the formation of fractures, that in turn yield light.
- Piezoluminescence is caused by pressure that results in elastic deformation and large polarization from the piezoelectric effect.
- Triboluminescence is nominally caused by rubbing, but sometimes occurs because of resulting fractoluminescence. It is often used as a synonym.

Mechanoluminescence can be produced through various means, such as ultrasound (e.g., causing crystals suspended in slurries to collide with one another and shatter). The related phenomenon of sonoluminescence differs in that it pertains to liquids.

== See also ==
- List of light sources – Devices and processes that produce light
