= Sulfur lamp =

Lighting system

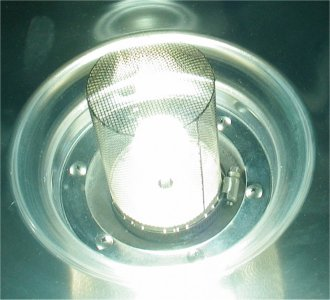
Sulfur lamp inside a Faraday cage, which is necessary to prevent microwave radiation leakage from the magnetron which would cause radio interference

The sulfur lamp (also sulphur lamp) is a highly efficient full-spectrum electrodeless lighting system whose light is generated by sulfur plasma that has been excited by microwave radiation. They are a particular type of plasma lamp, and one of the most modern. The technology was developed in the early 1990s and appeared promising, but was not a commercial success by the late 1990s. Since 2005, lamps are again being manufactured for commercial use.

== Mechanism ==
The sulfur lamp consists of a golf ball-sized (30 mm) fused-quartz bulb containing several milligrams of sulfur powder and argon gas at the end of a thin glass spindle. The bulb is enclosed in a microwave-resonant wire-mesh cage. A magnetron, much like the ones in home microwave ovens, bombards the bulb, via a waveguide, with 2.45 GHz microwaves. The microwave energy excites the gas to five atmospheres pressure, which in turn heats the sulfur to an extreme degree forming a brightly glowing plasma capable of illuminating a large area. Because the bulb heats considerably, it may be necessary to provide forced air cooling to prevent it from melting. The bulb is usually placed at the focus of a parabolic reflector to direct all the light in one direction.

It would be impossible to excite the sulfur using traditional electrodes since the sulfur would quickly react with and destroy any metallic electrode. A patent pending to employ coated electrodes is discussed in Future prospects below. The absence of electrodes allows for a much greater variety of light-generating substances to be used than those used in traditional lamps.

The design life of the bulb is approximately 60,000 hours. The design life of the magnetron has been improved by the Germany/England based Plasma International so it can also last for that same period.

The warm-up time of the sulfur lamp is notably shorter than for other gas discharge lamps, with the exception of fluorescent lamps, even at low ambient temperatures. It reaches 80% of its final luminous flux within 20 seconds, and the lamp can be restarted approximately five minutes after a power cut.

The first prototype lamps were 5.9 kW units, with a system efficiency of 80 lumens per watt. The first production models were 96.4 lumens per watt. Later models were able to eliminate the cooling fan and improve luminous efficacy to 100 lumens per watt.

By comparison, cost-effective commercially available LED chips are available with around 160 lumens per Watt (2023) efficacy, with a typical light output depreciation of 10% after 50,000 hours, dependent on operating environment.

== Quality of emitted light ==
The sulfur plasma consists mainly of dimer molecules (S_{2}), which generate the light through molecular emission. Unlike atomic emission, the emission spectrum is continuous throughout the visible spectrum. As much as 73% of the emitted radiation is in the visible spectrum, with a small amount in infrared energy and less than 1% in ultraviolet light.

The spectral output peaks at 510 nanometres, giving the light a greenish hue. The correlated color temperature is about 6,000 kelvins with a CRI of 79. The lamp can be dimmed to 15% without affecting the light quality.

A magenta filter can be used to give the light a warmer feel. Such a filter was used on the lamps at the National Air and Space Museum in Washington, D.C.

The addition of other chemicals in the bulb might improve color rendition. Sulfur lamp bulbs with calcium bromide (CaBr_{2}) added produce a similar spectrum plus a spike in red wavelengths at 625 nm. Other additives such as lithium iodide (LiI) and sodium iodide (NaI) can be used to modify the output spectra.

== History ==
The technology was conceived by engineer Michael Ury, physicist Charles Wood and their colleagues in 1990. With support from the United States Department of Energy, it was further developed in 1994 by Fusion Lighting of Rockville, Maryland, a spinoff of the Fusion UV division of Fusion Systems Corporation. Its origins are in microwave discharge light sources used for ultraviolet curing in the semiconductor and printing industries. The Fusion UV division was later sold to Spectris plc, and the rest of Fusion Systems was later acquired by the Eaton Corporation. Only two production models were developed, both with similar specifications: the Solar 1000 in 1994 and the Light Drive 1000 in 1997, which was a refinement of the previous model. Production of these lamps ended in 1998. Fusion Lighting closed its Rockville, MD location in early 2002-February 2003, after consuming approximately $90 million in venture capital. Their patents were licensed to the LG Group. Their lamps were installed in more than one hundred facilities worldwide, but many of them have since been removed.

In 2001, Ningbo Youhe New Lighting Source Co., Ltd, in Ningbo, China, produced its own sulfur lamp version. In 2006, LG Electronics began production of its sulfur lamps, called Plasma Lighting System]. Sulfur lamps were produced in the 2010s by Hive Lighting as the Wasp 1000. It can be identified by the mesh that surrounds the glass bulb. It was later discontinued.

== Electromagnetic interference ==
The magnetrons in these lamps may cause electromagnetic interference in the 2.4 GHz wireless spectrum, which is used by Wi-Fi, cordless phones and satellite radio in North America. Fearing interference with their broadcasts, Sirius and XM satellite radio petitioned the United States Federal Communications Commission (FCC) to force Fusion Lighting to reduce the electromagnetic emissions of their lamps by 99.9%. In 2001, Fusion Lighting agreed to install metal shielding around their lamps to reduce electromagnetic emissions by 95%.

In May 2003, the FCC terminated the proceeding that would have defined out-of-band emission limits for radio-frequency lights operating at 2.45 GHz, saying the record of the proceeding had become outdated and Fusion Lighting had stopped working on such lamps. The order concluded:

We therefore decline to provide the requested relief from the Satellite Radio Licensees to prohibit operation of all RF lights in the 2.45 GHz band, as we find that the requested prohibition is overarching and is not warranted based on the circumstances. If there is evidence that any entity will seek to operate RF lights in the 2.45 GHz band and cause harmful interference to satellite radio receivers as a consequence, and our existing limits prove inadequate, we will at that time take appropriate action.

== Environmental issues ==
Unlike fluorescent and high-intensity discharge lamps, sulfur lamps contain no mercury. Therefore, sulfur lamps do not pose a threat to the environment nor require special disposal. In addition, use of sulfur lamps has the potential to reduce the total amount of energy required for lighting.

== Light distribution systems ==
As sulfur lamps in current production have a high output, it is often necessary to distribute the light to areas removed from the lamp. This can be achieved by using light pipes as a conduit.

=== Light pipes ===
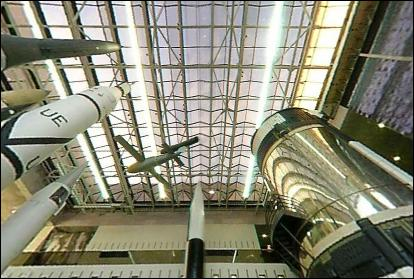
Sulfur lamps with light pipes on the ceiling of the U.S. Air and Space Museum in Washington, D.C.

The 3M light pipe is a long, transparent, hollow cylinder with a prismatic surface developed by 3M that distributes the light uniformly over its length. Light pipes can be as long as 40 metres (130 ft) and are assembled on site from shorter, modular units. The light pipe is attached to the parabolic reflector of the sulfur lamp. For shorter pipes, there will be a mirror at the opposite end; for longer ones, there will be a lamp at each end. The overall appearance of a light pipe has been compared to that of a giant-sized fluorescent tube. One sulfur lamp with a light pipe can replace dozens of HID lamps. In the National Air and Space Museum, three lamps, each with a 27-metre (89 ft) pipe, replaced 94 HID lamps while greatly increasing the amount of light delivered.

A reduced number of individual lamps may simplify maintenance and reduce installation costs but may also require a backup system for areas where lighting is critical. The light pipes allow the lamp to be placed in an easily accessible area for maintenance and away from places where the heat of the lamp may be a problem.

=== Secondary reflectors ===
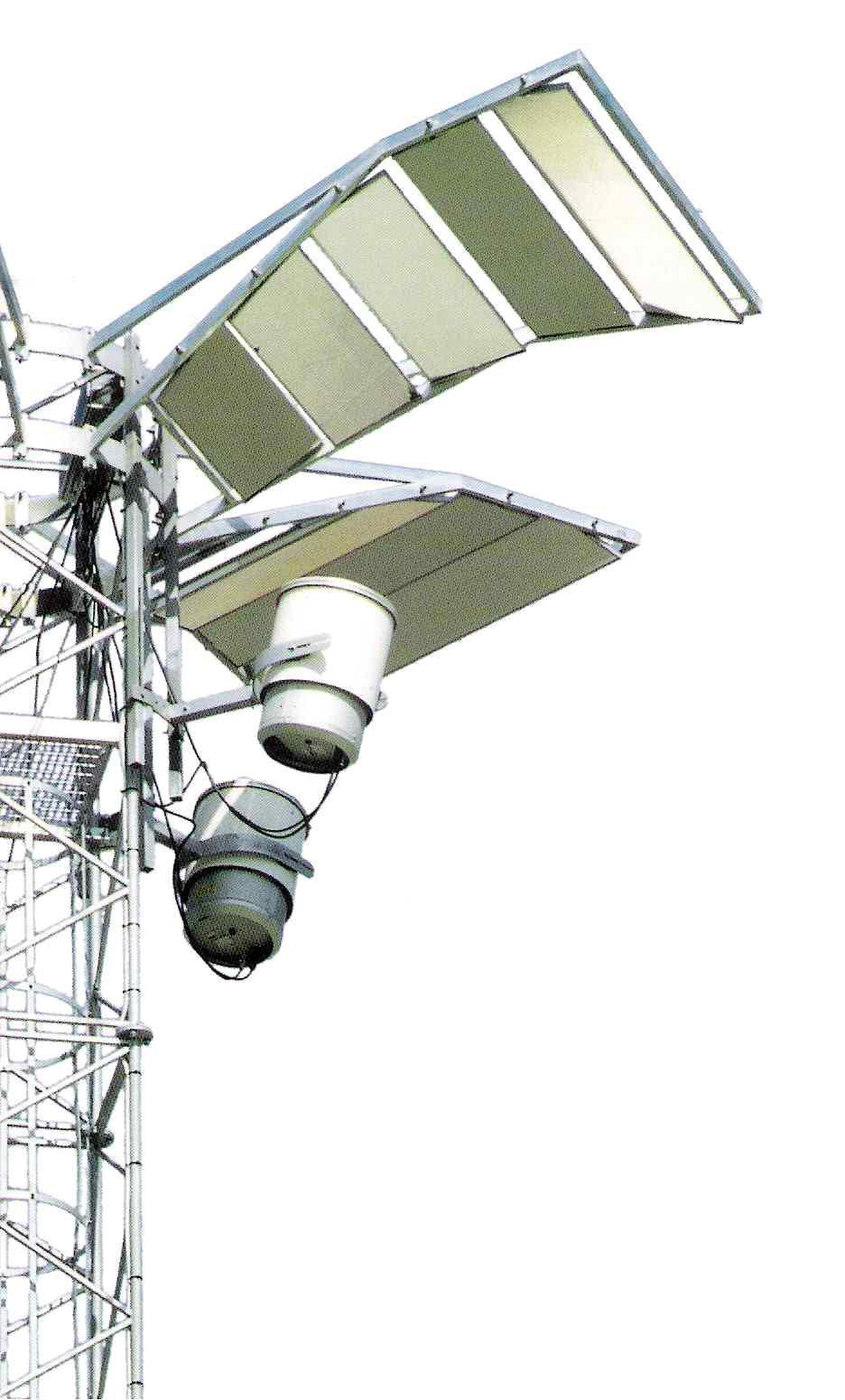
Sulfur lamp with reflectors

A secondary reflector is a structure with a mirrored surface placed directly into the path of the beam of light as it exits the parabolic primary reflector of the lamp. A secondary reflector can have a complex geometry which allows it to break up the light and direct it to where it is desired. It can spotlight an object or spread out the light for general illumination.

At Sundsvall-Härnösand Airport near Sundsvall, Sweden, airfield lighting is provided by sulfur lamps mounted on towers 30 metres tall. The lamps are directed upward and shine their light onto wing-shaped secondary reflectors that spread the light out and direct it downward. In this way, one lamp can illuminate an area 30 by 80 metres (100 by 260 ft).

At the headquarters of DONG Energy, an energy company in Denmark, a single sulfur lamp directs its light onto numerous specular reflectors and diffusers to illuminate the entrance hall as well as several sculptures outside of the building.

At the entrance to University Hospital in Lund, Sweden, secondary reflectors on the ceiling are clad with highly reflective films, but shaped so as to avoid any glare. Moreover, since these films have a microprismatic surface structure that splits up the beams, the risk of glare problems is further reduced. The fact that the reflectors move the light source far away from the eye of anyone who would happen to look into them helps to further eliminate glare problems.

=== Indirect lighting ===
Indirect fixtures direct most of their luminous flux upward toward a ceiling. A highly reflective ceiling can then serve as a secondary source of diffusive, low luminance, high visual quality lighting for interior spaces. The primary advantages of indirect lighting are the opportunity to significantly reduce indirect glare potential and to eliminate direct source viewing.

At the Sacramento Municipal Utility District (SMUD) headquarters building, two sulfur lamps were installed in the tops of free-standing kiosks. The 4.2-metre (13 ft 9 in) high ceiling was retrofit with high reflectance (90%), white acoustic ceiling tile. The lamps direct their light upward, and it is reflected off the ceiling providing indirect light. Narrow, medium, or wide beam patterns can be created by choosing various reflector elements.

=== Direct lighting ===
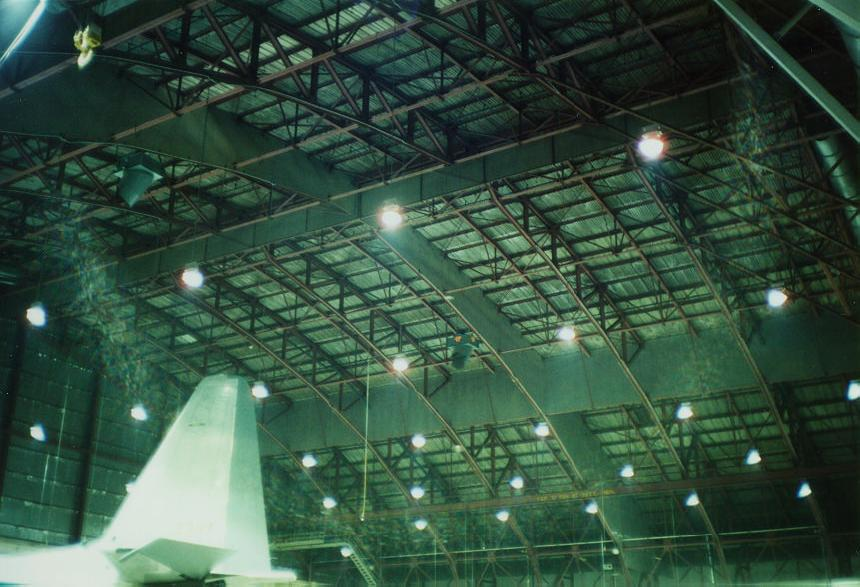
Hill AFB downlights

Light pipes would not be necessary in applications such as stadium lighting, where a plain fixture can be mounted high enough so that the light can spread over a large area. The installation at Hill Air Force Base contains lamps with light pipes as well as downlight fixtures mounted high in an aircraft hangar.

=== Optical fibers ===
Optical fibers have been studied as a distribution system for sulfur lamps, but no practical system has ever been marketed.

== Other uses ==
Sulfur lamps can be used as light sources in scientific instruments.

== Future prospects ==
The development of an affordable, efficient, and long-lived microwave source is a technological hurdle to cost reduction and commercial success. The lamp prototypes were only available in high wattages (1000+ W), which impeded adoption in applications where light output demands were not great. The sulfur lamp has problems with the life of the magnetron and the motor that rotates the bulb and noise from the cooling fan. Because most sulfur lamps have moving parts, reliability remains a critical issue, and system maintenance may impede market adoption, however newer-design lamps which no longer require active cooling are commercially available. Researchers have had some success at eliminating the need to rotate the bulb by using circularly polarized microwaves to spin the plasma discharge instead. Other experiments have used sodium iodide, scandium iodide, indium monobromide (InBr), or tellurium as the light-generating medium.

== Prominent installations ==
Many of the installations of the lamps were for testing purposes only, but there remain a few sites where the lamps are in use as the primary lighting source. Perhaps the most visible of these would be the glass atria in the National Air and Space Museum.

== See also ==
- Electrodeless lamp
- Plasma lamp
- List of light sources
- Timeline of lighting technology
