= Induction lamp =

Gas-discharge lamp using induction to excite the gas inside

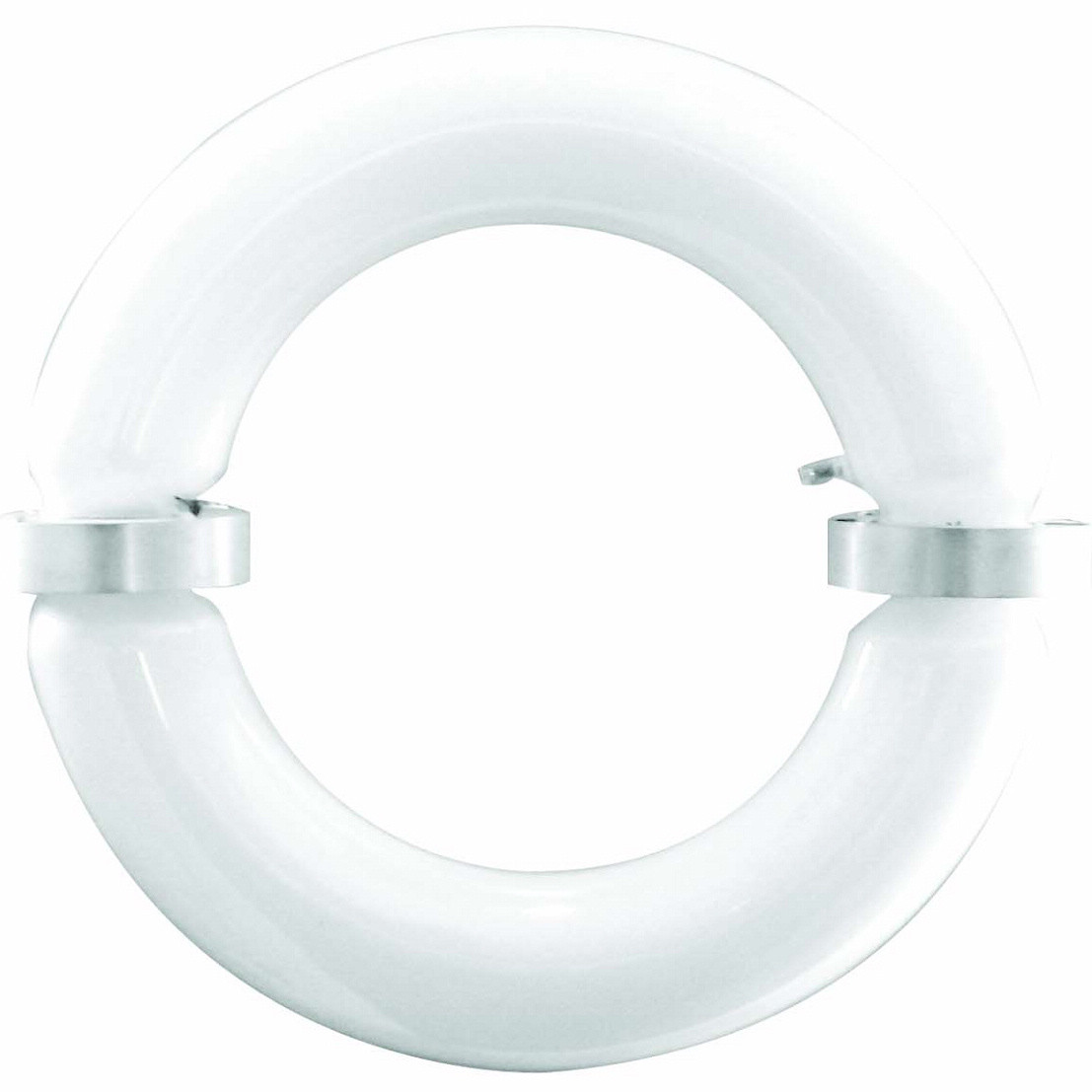
A round induction fluorescent lamp

The induction lamp, electrodeless lamp, or electrodeless induction lamp is a gas-discharge lamp in which an electric or magnetic field transfers the power required to generate light from outside the lamp envelope to the gas inside. This is in contrast to a typical gas-discharge lamp that uses internal electrodes connected to the power supply by conductors that pass through the lamp envelope. Eliminating the internal electrodes provides two advantages:

- Extended lamp life (internal electrodes are the most limiting factor in lamp life, since their metal content gets sputtered onto the lamp ends every time they are turned on)
- Ability to use higher-efficiency light-generating substances that would react with internal metal electrodes in conventional fluorescent lamps

Two systems are common: plasma lamps, in which microwaves or radio waves energize a bulb filled with sulfur vapor or metal halides, and fluorescent induction lamps, which are like conventional fluorescent lamp bulbs that induce current with an external or an internal coil of wire via electromagnetic induction.

== History ==
In 1882, Philip Diehl was awarded a patent for a kind of induction incandescent lamp.

Nikola Tesla demonstrated wireless transfer of power to electrodeless lamps in his lectures and articles in the 1890s, and subsequently patented a system of light and power distribution on those principles.

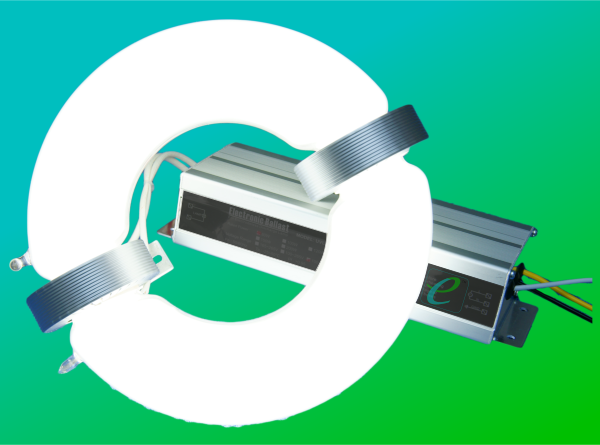
Example of a round 150 W magnetic induction fluorescent lamp

In 1967 and 1968, John Anderson of General Electric applied for patents for electrodeless lamps. In 1971, Fusion UV Systems installed a 300-watt electrodeless microwave plasma UV lamp on a Coors can production line. Philips introduced their QL induction lighting systems, operating at 2.65 MHz, in 1990 in Europe and in 1992 in the US. Matsushita had induction light systems available in 1992. Intersource Technologies also announced one in 1992, called the E-lamp. Operating at 13.6 MHz, it was available on the US market in 1993.

In 1990, Michael Ury, Charles Wood, and colleagues formulated the concept of the sulfur lamp. With support from the United States Department of Energy, it was further developed in 1994 by Fusion Lighting of Rockville, Maryland, a spinoff of the Fusion UV division of Fusion Systems Corporation. Its origins are in microwave discharge light sources used for ultraviolet curing in the semiconductor and printing industries.

Since 1994, General Electric has produced its induction lamp Genura with an integrated high frequency driver, operating at 2.65 MHz. In 1996, Osram started selling their Endura induction light system, operating at 250 kHz. It is available in the US as the Sylvania Icetron. In 1997, PQL Lighting introduced in the US the Superior Life Brand induction lighting systems. Most induction lighting systems are rated for 100,000 hours of use before requiring absolute component replacements.

From 1995, the former distributors of Fusion, Jenton / Jenact, expanded on the fact that energised UV-emitting plasmas act as lossy conductors to create a number of patents regarding electrodeless UV lamps for sterilising and germicidal uses.

Around 2000, a system was developed that concentrated radio frequency waves into a solid dielectric waveguide made of ceramic which energized a light-emitting plasma in a bulb positioned inside. This system, for the first time, permitted an extremely bright and compact electrodeless lamp. The invention has been a matter of dispute. Claimed by Frederick Espiau (then of Luxim, now of Topanga Technologies), Chandrashekhar Joshi, and Yian Chang, these claims were disputed by Ceravision Limited. A number of the core patents were assigned to Ceravision.

In 2005, Amko Solara in Taiwan introduced induction lamps that can dim and use Internet-Protocol-based controls. Their lamps have a range from 12 to 400 watts and operate at 250 kHz.

In 2006, Luxim introduced a projector-lamp product trade-named LIFI. The company further extended the technology with light-source products in instrument, entertainment, street, area, and architectural lighting applications among others throughout 2007 and 2008.

In 2009, Ceravision Limited introduced the first high-efficiency plasma (HEP) lamp under the trade name Alvara. This lamp replaces the opaque ceramic waveguide in earlier lamps with an optically clear quartz waveguide that increases efficiency. In previous lamps, the burner, or bulb, was very efficient, but the opaque ceramic waveguide severely obstructed the projection of light. A quartz waveguide passes all the light from the plasma.

In 2012, Topanga Technologies introduced a line of advanced plasma lamps (APL), driven by a solid-state radio-frequency (RF) driver, thereby circumventing the limited life of magnetron-based drivers, with system power of 127 and 230 volts and system efficacies of 96 and 87 lumen/watt, with a CRI of about 70.

Several companies licensed this technology and it became the viable energy-saving solution for lighting retrofits and upgrades before LED lighting reached a viable efficacy solution point. It was widely used in roadway and high-mast applications around the world, replacing 400-watt, 750-watt and 1000-watt metal-halide and high-pressure sodium systems. The light-emitting plasma (LEP) solution was great as it offered a much higher lumen density than its HID counterparts, approximately 50% power reduction, and could be at full intensity in around 45-60 seconds from either a cold or hot strike, unlike its HID predecessors.

== Plasma lamps ==
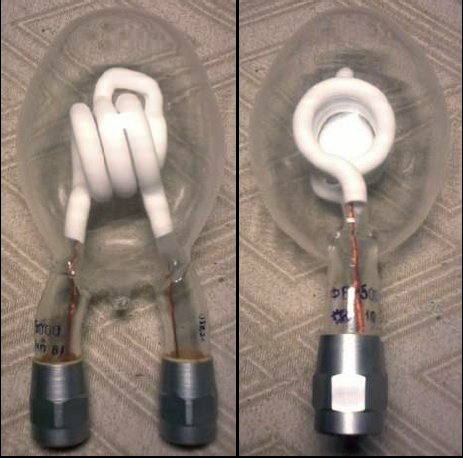
A 5 KW Soviet plasma xenon lamp made in 1981. The inner white spiral tube is for cooling.

Plasma lamps are a family of light sources that generate light by exciting a plasma inside a closed transparent burner or bulb using radio-frequency (RF) power. Typically, such lamps use a noble gas or a mixture of these gases and additional materials such as metal halides, sodium, mercury, or sulfur. A waveguide is used to constrain and focus the electrical field into the plasma. In operation, the gas is ionized and free electrons, accelerated by the electrical field, collide with gas and metal atoms. Some electrons circling around the gas and metal atoms are excited by these collisions, bringing them to a higher energy state. When the electron falls back to its original state, it emits a photon, resulting in visible light or ultraviolet radiation depending on the fill materials.

The first plasma lamp was an ultraviolet curing lamp with a bulb filled with argon and mercury vapor, developed by Fusion UV. That lamp led Fusion Systems to develop the sulfur lamp, which concentrates microwaves through a hollow waveguide to bombard a bulb filled with argon and sulfur.

In the past, the magnetron that generates the microwaves limited the reliability of electrodeless lamps. Solid-state RF generation works and gives long life. However, using solid-state chips to generate RF is currently around fifty times more expensive than using a magnetron, and so only appropriate for high-value lighting niches. Dipolar of Sweden has showed that it is possible to greatly extend the life of magnetrons to over 40,000 hours, making low-cost plasma lamps possible. Plasma lamps are currently produced by Ceravision and Luxim and in development by Topanga Technologies.

Ceravision has introduced a combined lamp and luminaire under the trade name Alvara for use in high-bay and street-lighting applications. It uses an optically clear quartz waveguide with an integral burner so all the light from the plasma passes through. The small source also lets the luminaire use more than 90% of the available light compared with 55% for typical HID fittings. Ceravision claims the highest Luminaire Efficacy Rating (LER) of any light fitting on the market, and to have created the first high-efficiency plasma (HEP) lamp. Ceravision uses a magnetron to generate the required RF power and claims a life of 20,000 hours.

Luxim's LIFI lamp, claims 120 lumens per RF watt (i.e. before taking into account electrical losses). It was also used in a line of now-discontinued Panasonic rear-projection TVs.

== Magnetic induction lamps ==
External closed-core induction lamp with two-turn primary

A Philips QL induction lighting system, where (A) Discharge vessel, (B) Tube with power coupler and (C) Electronic high frequency driver.

Aside from the method of coupling energy into the mercury vapor, these lamps are very similar to conventional fluorescent lamps. Mercury vapor in the discharge vessel is electrically excited to produce short-wave ultraviolet light, which then excites internal phosphors to produce visible light. While still relatively unknown to the public, these lamps have been available since 1990. Unlike an incandescent lamp or conventional fluorescent lamps, there is no electrical connection going inside the glass bulb; the energy is transferred through the glass envelope solely by electromagnetic induction. There are two main types of magnetic induction lamps: external-core lamps and internal-core lamps. The first commercially available and still widely used form of induction lamp is the internal-core type. The external-core type, which was commercialized later, has a wider range of applications and is available in round, rectangular, and "olive"-shaped form factors.

External-core lamps are basically fluorescent lamps with magnetic cores wrapped around a part of the discharge tube. The core is usually made of ferrite, a ceramic material containing iron oxide and other metals. In external-core lamps, high-frequency energy from a special power supply passes through wires that are wrapped in a coil around a toroidal ferrite core placed around the outside of a portion of the glass tube. This creates a high-frequency magnetic field within the ferrite core. Since the magnetic permeability of the ferrite is hundreds or thousands of times higher than that of the surrounding air or glass, and the ferrite core provides a closed path for the magnetic field, the ferrite core contains virtually all of the magnetic field.

Cross section through internal-inductor lamp

Following Faraday's law of induction, the time-varying magnetic field in the core generates a time-varying electric voltage in any closed path that encloses the time-varying magnetic field. The discharge tube forms one such closed path around the ferrite core, and in that manner the time-varying magnetic field in the core generates a time-varying electric field in the discharge tube. There is no need for the magnetic field to penetrate the discharge tube. The electric field generated by the time-varying magnetic field drives the mercury-gas discharge in the same way the discharge is driven by the electric field in a conventional fluorescent lamp. The primary winding on the ferrite core, the core, and the discharge form a transformer, with the discharge being a one-turn secondary on that transformer.

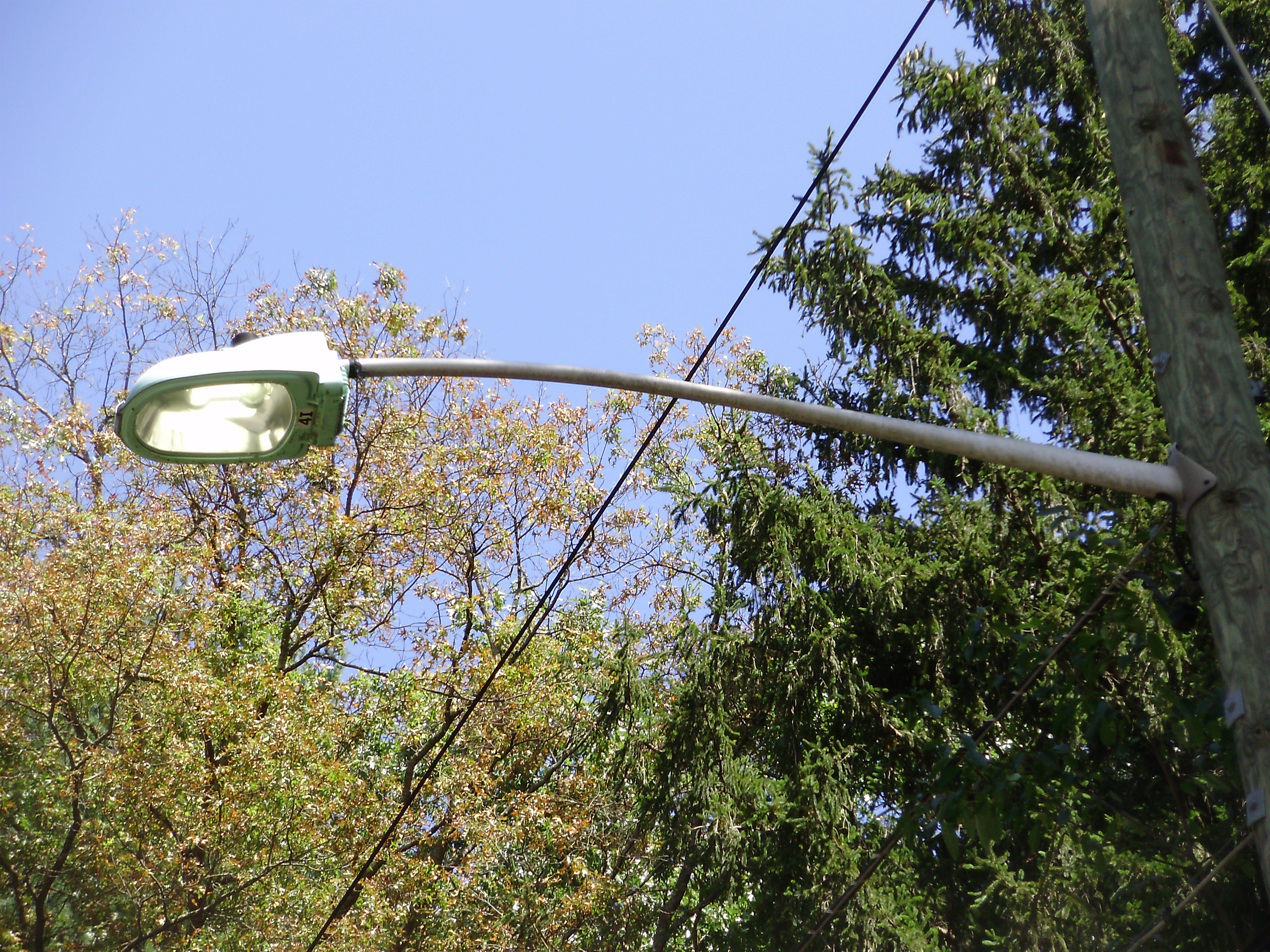
Induction street light

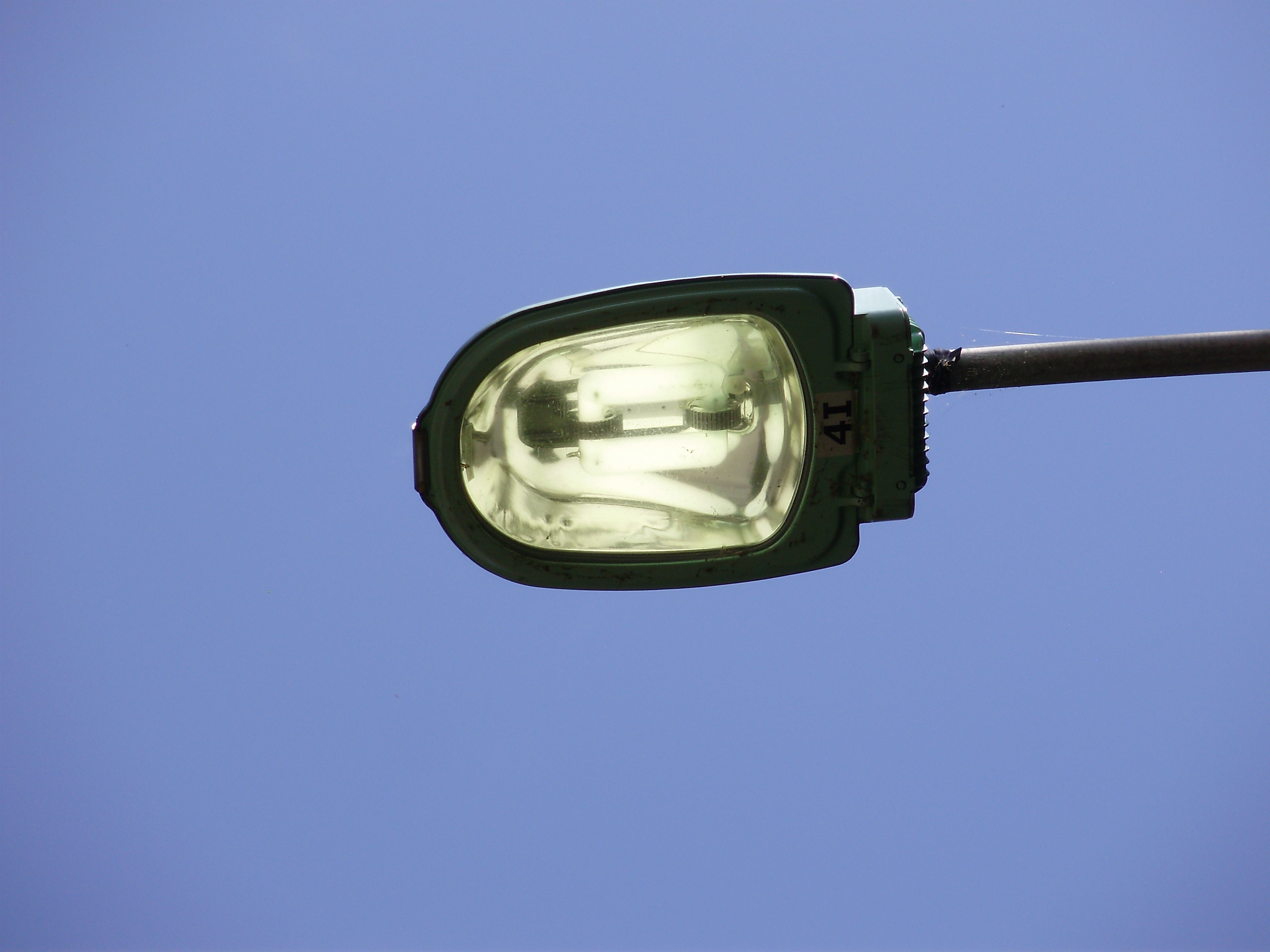
Closer view of light

The discharge tube contains a low pressure of a gas such as argon and mercury vapor. The mercury atoms are provided by a drop of liquid mercury, or by a semi-solid amalgam of mercury and other metals such as bismuth, lead, or tin. Some of the liquid mercury or the mercury in the amalgam vaporizes to provide the mercury vapor. The electric field ionizes some of the mercury atoms to produce free electrons, and then accelerates those free electrons. When the free electrons collide with mercury atoms, some of those atoms absorb energy from the electrons and are "excited" to higher energy levels. After a short delay, the excited mercury atoms spontaneously relax to their original lower-energy state and emit a UV photon with the excess energy. As in a conventional fluorescent tube, the UV photon diffuses through the gas to the inside of the outer bulb, and is absorbed by the phosphor coating that surface, transferring its energy to the phosphor. When the phosphor then relaxes to its original, lower-energy state, it emits visible light. In this way the UV photon is down-converted to visible light by the phosphor coating on the inside of the tube. The glass walls of the lamp prevent the emission of the UV photons because ordinary glass blocks UV radiation at the 253.7 nm and shorter wavelengths.

In the internal-core form (see diagram), a glass tube (B) protrudes bulb-ward from the bottom of the discharge vessel (A), forming a re-entrant cavity. This tube contains an antenna called a power coupler, which consists of a coil wound over a cylindrical ferrite core. The coil and ferrite form the inductor that couples the energy into the lamp interior

The antenna coils receive electric power from the electronic high frequency driver (C) that generates a high frequency. The exact frequency varies with lamp design, but popular examples include 13.6 MHz, 2.65 MHz, and 250 kHz. A special resonant circuit in the driver produces an initial high voltage on the coil to start a gas discharge; thereafter, the voltage is reduced to normal running level.

The system can be seen as a type of transformer, with the power coupler (inductor) forming the primary coil and the gas discharge arc in the bulb forming the one-turn secondary coil and the load of the transformer. The driver is connected to mains electricity, and is generally designed to operate on voltages between 100 and 277 VAC at a frequency of 50 or 60 Hz, or on a voltage between 100 and 400 VDC for battery-fed emergency light systems. Many drivers are available in low-voltage models so can also be connected to DC voltage sources like batteries for emergency lighting purposes or for use with renewable-powered systems.

In other conventional gas discharge lamps, the electrodes are the part with the shortest life, limiting lamp lifespan severely. Since an induction lamp has no electrodes, it can have a longer service life. For induction lamp systems with a separate driver, the service life can be as long as 100,000 hours, which is 11.4 years of continuous operation. For induction lamps with integrated drivers, the lifespan is in the 15,000-to-50,000-hours range. Extremely high-quality electronic circuits are needed for the driver to attain such a long service life. Such lamps are typically used in commercial or industrial applications. Typically, operations and maintenance costs are significantly lower with induction lighting systems due to their industry-average 100,000-hour life cycle and five- to ten-year warranty.

=== Advantages ===
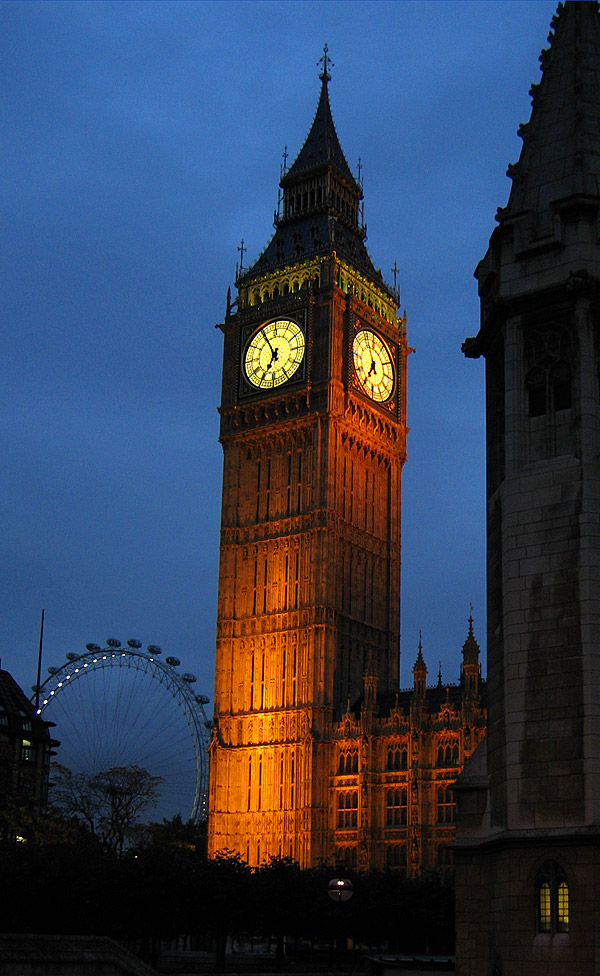
The London landmark clock tower containing Big Ben. The clock face is lit by electrodeless lamps.

- Long lifespan due to the lack of electrodes – strictly speaking, almost indefinite on the lamp but between 25,000 and 100,000 hours, depending on lamp model and quality of electronics used;
- High energy conversion efficiency of between 62 and 90 lumens/watt (higher-power lamps are more energy efficient).

=== Disadvantages ===
- Some internal inductor lamps that use high-frequency drivers can produce radio frequency interference (RFI) that can interfere with radio communications. Newer external-inductor lamps use low-frequency drivers that usually have FCC or other certification, thus suggesting compliance with RFI regulations.
- Some types of induction lamps contain mercury, which is highly toxic if released to the environment (like all fluorescent lamps).

== See also ==
- List of light sources
- Induction cooker
