= Piezoluminescence =

Emission of light created by pressure

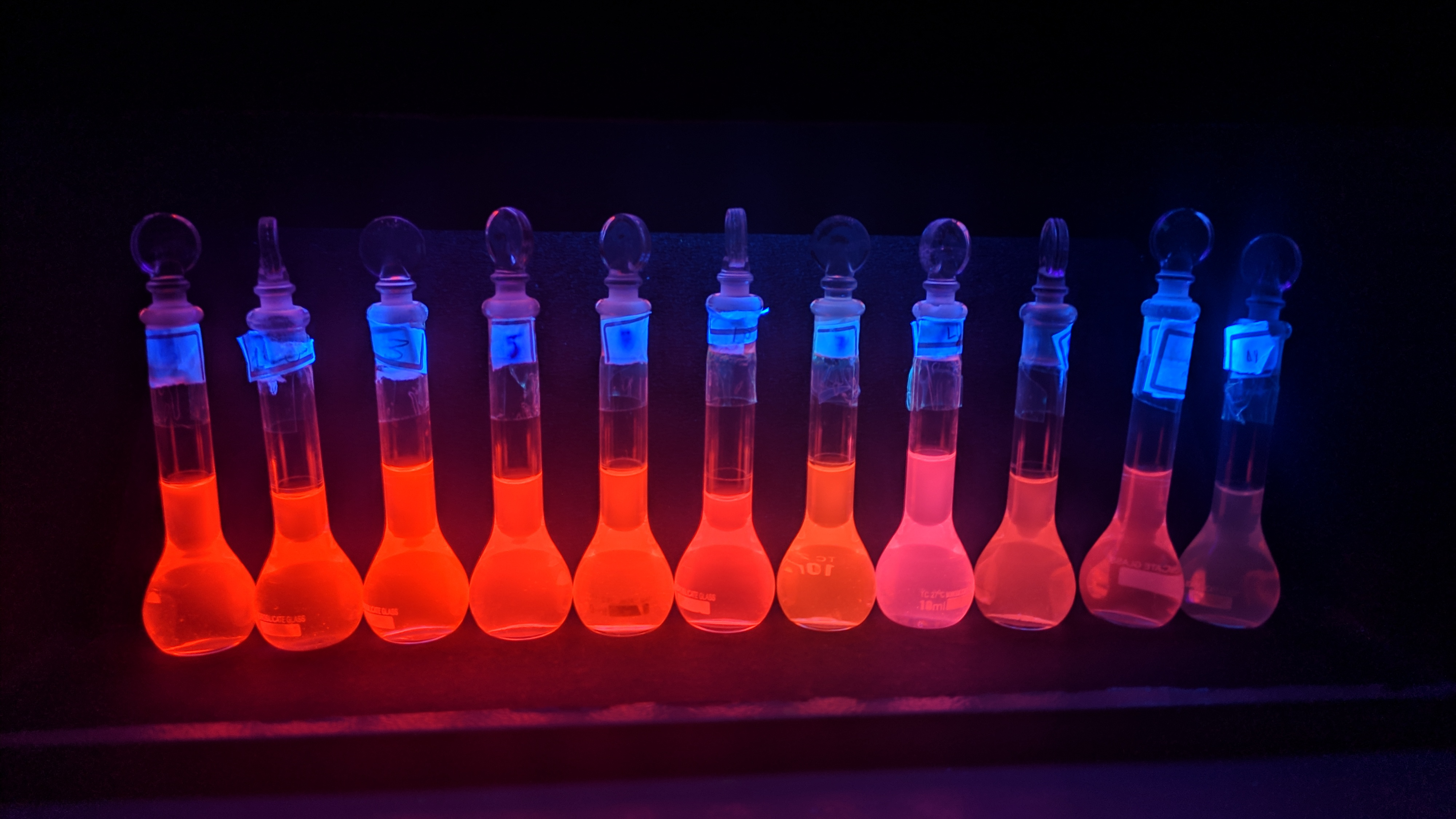
Luminescence material with different solvent under UV light

Piezoluminescence is a form of luminescence created by pressure upon certain solids. This phenomenon is characterized by recombination processes involving electrons, holes, and impurity ion centres. Some piezoelectric crystals give off a certain amount of piezoluminescence when under pressure. Irradiated salts, such as NaCl, KCl, KBr, and polycrystalline chips of LiF (TLD-100), have been found to exhibit piezoluminescent properties. It has also been discovered that ferroelectric polymers exhibit piezoluminescence upon the application of stress.

In the folk-literature surrounding psychedelic production, DMT, 5-MeO-DMT, and LSD have been reported to exhibit piezoluminescence. As specifically noted in the book Acid Dreams, it is stated that Augustus Owsley Stanley III, one of the most prolific producers of LSD in the 1960s, observed piezoluminescence in the compound's purest form, an observation confirmed by Alexander Shulgin: "A totally pure salt, when dry and when shaken in the dark, will emit small flashes of white light."

== See also ==
- Mechanoluminescence
- Triboluminescence
