= Luxim =

Clean-tech company in Sunnyvale, California

- Company type: Privately held company
- Headquarters: Sunnyvale, CA
- Website: www.luxim.com

Luxim is a privately owned clean-tech company based in Sunnyvale, California, which was founded in 2000. Luxim manufactures a solid-state electrodeless lamp lighting system. Luxim technology is used in general lighting, entertainment lighting, instrumentation lighting and speciality lighting.

Their light-emitting plasma (LEP) lamp is claimed to be able to operate up to 50% more efficiently than conventional high-intensity discharge lamps (HIDs) while generating the same maintained lumen as a conventional 400-watt system at about half the energy. Luxim's light-emitting plasma is designed to complement LED. LEP is designed for use in high illuminance applications.

In the general lighting market, Luxim offers two products: the STA 41-01 and the STA 41-02. Both systems have a correlated color temperature (CCT) in the 5600–5700 range. The STA 41-01 has a color rendering index (CRI) of 75 and a life of 50,000 hours, the STA 41-02 has a CRI of 95 and a life of 30,000 hours. These products are used in high-illuminance applications such as streets, parking lots, big-box retailers, distribution centers, parks, and sports lighting applications.

Luxim works with a variety of luminare manufactures across the world. Presently, the following luminaire types are available on the market: Cobra head, shoe-box, high bay, low bay, canopy, aquarium, and architectural.

In 2013, Luxim merged with Singapore-based Luma Investments Limited's energy-efficient total lighting company JK Yaming.
