= Argon flash =

Single-use source of very short and extremely bright flash of light

Argon flash, also known as argon bomb, argon flash bomb, argon candle, and argon light source, is a single-use source of very short and extremely bright flashes of light. The light is generated by a shock wave in argon or, less commonly, another noble gas. The shock wave is usually produced by an explosion. Argon flash devices are almost exclusively used for photographing explosions and shock waves.

Although krypton and xenon can be also used, argon is favored because of its low cost.

== Process ==
The light generated by an explosion is produced primarily by compression heating of the surrounding air. Replacement of the air with a noble gas considerably increases the light output; with molecular gases, the energy is consumed partially by dissociation and other processes, while noble gases are monatomic and can only undergo ionization; the ionized gas then produces the light. The low specific heat capacity of noble gases allows heating to higher temperatures, yielding brighter emission. Flashtubes are filled with noble gases for the same reason.

== Engineering ==
Typical argon flash devices consist of an argon-filled cardboard or plastic tube with a transparent window on one end and an explosive charge on the other end. Many explosives can be used; Composition B, PETN, RDX, and plastic bonded explosives are just a few examples.

The device consists of a vessel filled with argon and a solid explosive charge. The explosion generates a shock wave, which heats the gas to very high temperature (over 10^{4} K; published values vary between 15,000 K to 30,000 K with the best values around 25,000 K). The gas becomes incandescent and emits a flash of intense visible and ultraviolet black-body radiation. The emission for the temperature range is highest between 97–193 nm, but usually only the visible and near-ultraviolet ranges are exploited.

To achieve emission, the layer of at least one or two optical depths of the gas has to be compressed to sufficient temperature. The light intensity rises to full magnitude in about 0.1 microsecond. For about 0.5 microsecond the shock wave front instabilities are sufficient to create significant striations in the produced light; this effect diminishes as the thickness of the compressed layer increases. Only an about 75 micrometer thick layer of the gas is responsible for the light emission. The shock wave reflects after reaching the window at the end of the tube; this yields a brief increase of light intensity. The intensity then fades.

The amount of explosive can control the intensity of the shock wave and therefore of the flash. The intensity of the flash can be increased and its duration decreased by reflecting the shock wave by a suitable obstacle; a foil or a curved glass can be used. The duration of the flash is about as long as the explosion itself, depending on the construction of the lamp, between 0.1 and 100 microseconds. The duration is dependent on the length of the shockwave path through the gas, which is proportional to the length of the tube; it was shown that each centimeter of the path of shock wave through the argon medium is equivalent to 2 microseconds.

== Uses ==
Argon flash is a standard procedure for high-speed photography, especially for photographing explosions, or less commonly for use in high altitude test vehicles. The photography of explosions and shock waves is made easy by the fact that the detonation of the argon flash lamp charge can be accurately timed relative to the test specimen explosion and the light intensity can overpower the light generated by the explosion itself. The formation of shock waves during explosions of shaped charges can be imaged this way.

As the amount of released radiant energy is fairly high, significant heating of the illuminated object can occur. Especially in the case of high explosives, this has to be taken into account.

Superradiant Light (SRL) sources are an alternative to argon flash. An electron beam source delivers a brief and intense pulse of electrons to suitable crystals (e.g. doped cadmium sulfide). Flash times in the nanosecond to picosecond range are achievable. Pulsed lasers are another alternative.

== See also ==
- Sonoluminescence
