= Field-induced polymer electroluminescent technology =

Electroluminescent light source

Field-induced polymer electroluminescent (FIPEL) technology is a low power electroluminescent light source. Three layers of moldable light-emitting polymer blended with a small amount of carbon nanotubes glow when an alternating current is passed through them. The technology can produce white light similar to that of the Sun, or other tints if desired. It is also more efficient than compact fluorescent lamps in terms of the energy required to produce light. As cited from the Carroll Research Group at Wake Forest University, "To date our brightest device – without output couplers – exceeds 18,000 cd/m2." This confirms that FIPEL technology is a viable solution for area lighting.

FIPEL lights are different from LED lighting, in that there is no junction. Instead, the light emitting component is a layer of polymer containing an iridium compound which is doped with multi-wall carbon nanotubes. This planar light emitting structure is energized by an AC field from insulated electrodes. The lights can be shaped into many different forms, from mimicking conventional light bulbs to unusual forms such as 2-foot-by-4-foot flat sheets and straight or bent tubes. The technology was developed by a team headed by Dr. David Carroll of Wake Forest University in Winston-Salem, North Carolina.

== See also ==
- Conductive polymer § Electroluminescence
