= Light-emitting electrochemical cell =

Light generation methodology

A light-emitting electrochemical cell (LEC or LEEC) is a solid-state device that generates light from an electric current (electroluminescence). LECs are usually composed of two metal electrodes connected by (e.g. sandwiching) an organic semiconductor containing mobile ions. Aside from the mobile ions, their structure is very similar to that of an organic light-emitting diode (OLED).

LECs have most of the advantages of OLEDs, as well as additional ones:

- The device is less dependent on the difference in work function of the electrodes. Consequently, the electrodes can be made of the same material (e.g. gold). Similarly, the device can still be operated at low voltages.
- Recently developed materials such as graphene or a blend of carbon nanotubes and polymers have been used as electrodes, eliminating the need for using indium tin oxide for a transparent electrode.
- The thickness of the active electroluminescent layer is not critical for the device to operate. This means that:
- LECs can be printed with relatively inexpensive printing processes (where control over film thicknesses can be difficult).
- In a planar device configuration, internal device operation can be observed directly.

There are two distinct types of LECs, those based on inorganic transition metal complexes (iTMC) or light emitting polymers. iTMC devices are often more efficient than their LEP based counterparts due to the emission mechanism being phosphorescent rather than fluorescent.

While electroluminescence had been seen previously in similar devices, the invention of the polymer LEC is attributed to Pei et al. Since then, numerous research groups and a few companies have worked on improving and commercializing the devices.

In 2012 the first inherently stretchable LEC using an elastomeric emissive material (at room temperature) was reported. Dispersing an ionic transition metal complex into an elastomeric matrix enables the fabrication of intrinsically stretchable light-emitting devices that possess large emission areas (~175 mm2) and tolerate linear strains up to 27% and repetitive cycles of 15% strain. This work demonstrates the suitability of this approach to new applications in conformable lighting that require uniform, diffuse light emission over large areas.

In 2012 fabrication of organic light-emitting electrochemical cells (LECs) using a roll-to-roll compatible process under ambient conditions was reported.

In 2017, a new design approach developed by a team of Swedish researchers promised to deliver substantially higher efficiency: 99.2 cd A^{−1} at a bright luminance of 1910 cd m^{−2}.

== See also ==
- Electrochemical cell
- Electrochemiluminescence
- Light-emitting diode
- Organic light-emitting diode
- Photoelectrolysis
