= Plasma lamp =

Type of electrodeless gas-discharge lamp

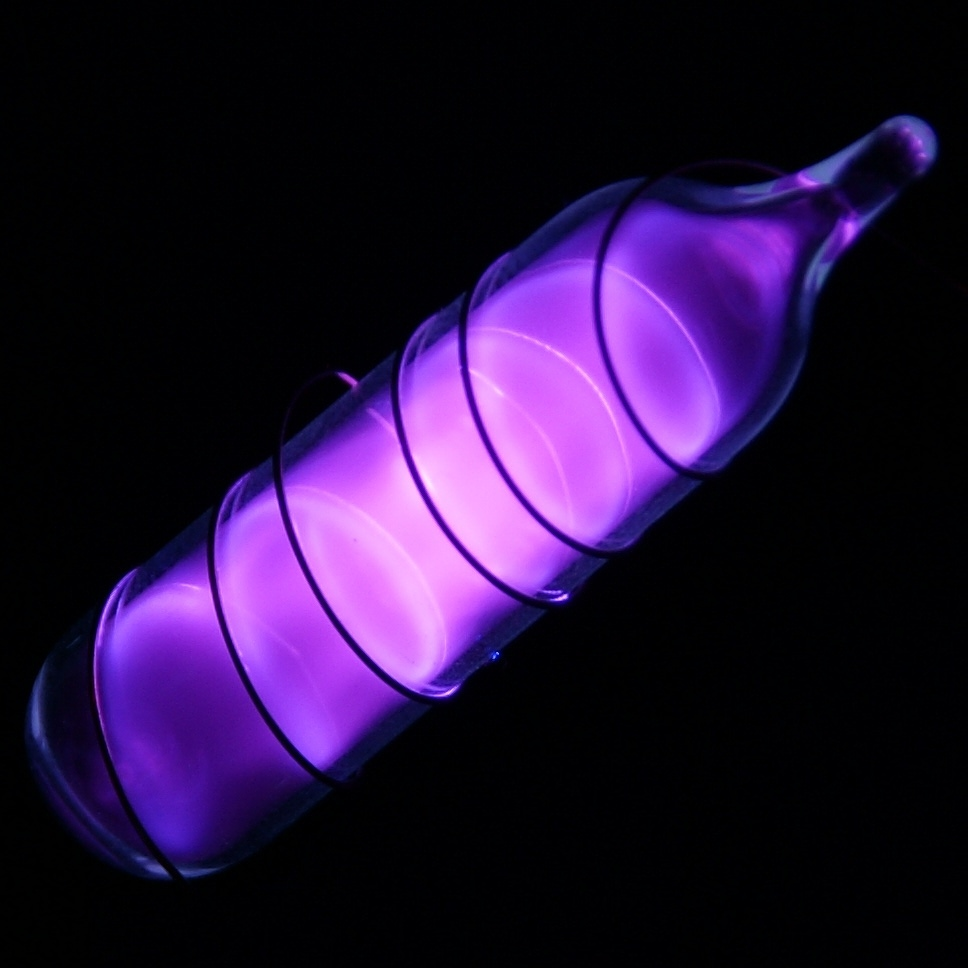
A plasma lamp

Plasma lamps are a type of electrodeless gas-discharge lamp energized by radio frequency (RF) power. They are distinct from the novelty plasma lamps that were popular in the 1980s.

The internal-electrodeless lamp was invented by Nikola Tesla after his experimentation with high-frequency currents in evacuated glass tubes for the purposes of lighting and the study of high voltage phenomena. The first practical plasma lamps were the sulfur lamps manufactured by Fusion Lighting. This lamp suffered several practical problems and did not prosper commercially. Plasma lamps with an internal phosphor coating are called external electrode fluorescent lamps (EEFL); these external electrodes or terminal conductors provide the radio frequency electric field.

== Description ==
Modern plasma lamps are a family of light sources that generate light by exciting plasma inside a closed transparent burner or bulb using radio frequency (RF) power. Typically, such lamps use a noble gas or a mixture of these gases and additional materials such as metal halides, sodium, mercury or sulfur. In modern plasma lamps, a waveguide is used to constrain and focus the electrical field into the plasma. In operation, the gas is ionized, and free electrons, accelerated by the electrical field, collide with gas and metal atoms. Some atomic electrons circling around the gas and metal atoms are excited by these collisions, bringing them to a higher energy state. When the electron falls back to its original state, it emits a photon, resulting in visible light or ultraviolet radiation, depending on the fill materials.

The first commercial plasma lamp was an ultraviolet curing lamp with a bulb filled with argon and mercury vapor developed by Fusion UV. That lamp led Fusion Lighting to the development of the sulfur lamp, a bulb filled with argon and sulfur that is bombarded with microwaves through a hollow waveguide. The bulb had to be spun rapidly to prevent the sulfur from burning through. Fusion Lighting did not prosper commercially, but other manufacturers continue to pursue sulfur lamps. Sulfur lamps, though relatively efficient, have had several problems, chiefly:

1. Limited life – Magnetrons had limited lives.
2. Large size
3. Heat – The sulfur burnt through the bulb wall unless it was rotated rapidly.
4. High power demand – They were not able to sustain a plasma in powers under 1000 W.

=== Limited life ===
In the past, the life of the plasma lamps was limited by the magnetron used to generate the microwaves. Solid-state RF chips can be used and give long lives. However, using solid-state chips to generate RF is currently an order of magnitude more expensive than using a magnetron and so only appropriate for high-value lighting niches.

=== Heat and power ===
The use of a high-dielectric waveguide allowed the sustaining of plasmas at much lower powers—down to 100 W in some instances. It also allowed the use of conventional gas-discharge lamp fill materials which removed the need to spin the bulb. The only issue with the ceramic waveguide was that much of the light generated by the plasma was trapped inside the opaque ceramic waveguide.

== High-efficiency plasma (HEP) ==
High-efficiency plasma lighting is the class of plasma lamps that have system efficiencies of 90 lumens per watt or more. Lamps in this class are potentially the most energy-efficient light source for outdoor, commercial, and industrial lighting. This is due not only to their high system efficiency but also to the small light source they present enabling very high luminaire efficiency.

Luminaire Efficacy Rating (LER) is the single figure of merit the National Electrical Manufacturers Association has defined to help address problems with lighting manufacturers' efficiency claims and is designed to allow robust comparison between lighting types. It is given by the product of luminaire efficiency (EFF) times total rated lamp output in lumens (TLL) times ballast factor (BF), divided by the input power in watts (IP):

LER = EFF × TLL × BF / IP

The "system efficiency" for a high-efficiency plasma lamp is given by the last three variables, that is, it excludes the luminaire efficiency. Though plasma lamps do not have a ballast, they have an RF power supply that fulfills the equivalent function. In electrodeless lamps, the inclusion of the electrical losses, or "ballast factor", in lumens per watt claimed can be particularly significant as the conversion of electrical power to radio frequency (RF) power can be a highly inefficient process.

Many modern plasma lamps have very small light sources—far smaller than HID bulbs or fluorescent tubes—leading to much higher luminaire efficiencies also. High-intensity discharge lamps have typical luminaire efficiencies of 55%, and fluorescent lamps of 70%. Plasma lamps typically have luminaire efficiencies exceeding 90%.

== Applications ==
Plasma lamps have been used in high bay and street lighting applications, as well as in stage lighting. They were briefly used in some projection televisions.
