= El =

EL, El or el may refer to:

== Arts and entertainment ==
=== Fictional entities ===
- El, a character from the manga series Shugo Chara! by Peach-Pit
- Eleven (Stranger Things) (El), a fictional character in the TV series Stranger Things
- El, family name of Kal-El (Superman) and his father Jor-El in the List of Superman dynasty characters
- E.L. Faldt, character in the road comedy film Road Trip

=== Music ===
- Él Records, an independent record label from the UK founded by Mike Alway
- Él (Lucerito album), a 1982 album by Lucerito
- "Él", Spanish song by Rubén Blades from the album Caminando
- "Él" (Lucía song), the Spanish entry performed by Lucía in the Eurovision Song Contest 1982

=== Other media ===
- Él, 1926 autobiographical novel by Mercedes Pinto
- Él (film), a 1953 film by Luis Buñuel based on the 1926 novel
- Él (visual novel), a 1991 Japanese adult visual novel
- EL TV, an Azerbaijani regional television channel

== Companies and organizations ==
- Estée Lauder Companies (NYSE:EL), American cosmetics manufacturer
- EssilorLuxottica (Euronext Paris:EL), French-Italian eyewear conglomerate
- NIST Engineering Laboratory, a NIST laboratory since 2010

== Science and technology ==
- El (crater), a crater on Ganymede
- Electroluminescence, in physics
  - Electroluminescent display, a display made with electroluminescent material
- Electrum (El), an alloy of gold and silver
- Encephalitis lethargica, a neurological disease
- Equilibrium level, the height in the atmosphere at which a rising parcel of air reaches surrounding air of the same temperature
- El (number), a pronunciation of the symbol for the number eleven in some duodecimal system notations

=== Computing ===
- .el, a computer file extension used for Emacs Lisp source code
- Enciclopedia Libre Universal en Español, a spin-off project of the Spanish Wikipedia
- Erase Line (ANSI), an ANSI X3.64 escape sequence
- Unified Expression Language, a feature of the JavaServer Pages software technology

== Sport ==
- Eastern League (disambiguation), a Class AA League in Minor League Baseball
- Euroleague Basketball, highest level tier and most important professional club basketball competition in Europe
- UEFA Europa League, formerly the UEFA Cup, a competition for eligible European football clubs

== Transportation ==
- Acura EL, an automobile
- Air Nippon (former IATA code: EL), a former Japanese regional airline
- Ellinair (former IATA code: EL), a former Greek airline
- Erie Lackawanna Railway (reporting mark: EL), US
- Elevated railway
  - Chicago "L", the rapid transit system in Chicago, US
  - El, one name of the elevated railway system on SEPTA, the Market–Frankford Line, Philadelphia, Pennsylvania, US
- Elizabeth line, a commuter rail line in London

== Language ==
- Al- or "El-" (Arabic: ال), Arabic prefix meaning "the" (definite article in Arabic), used in many family names
- El (Cyrillic) (Л, л), a letter of the Cyrillic alphabet
- Greek language (ISO 639-1 language code EL)
- L (spelled-out version), a letter in the Latin alphabet

== People ==
- EL (rapper) (born 1983), stage name of Elorm Adablah, a Ghanaian rapper and sound engineer
- El DeBarge (born 1961), music artist
- El Franco Lee (1949–2016), American politician

== Other uses ==
- El (deity), Semitic word for "god" and proper name of certain deities
- Party of the European Left, a political party
- Greece (EU VAT identification: EL)

== See also ==
- Él (disambiguation)
- Ell (disambiguation)
- Elle (disambiguation)
- Al (disambiguation)
- L (disambiguation)
