= Sada =

Sada may refer to:

== People ==
=== Given name ===
- Sada Abe (1905–after 1971), Japanese convicted murderer, prostitute and actress
- Sada Jacobson (born 1983), American Olympic fencer
- Sada Nahimana (born 2001), Burundian tennis player
- Sada Orihara (1908–1960), Japanese teacher
- Sada Thompson (1927–2011), American actress
- Sada Tomlinson (1876–1953), American nurse and missionary in China
- Sada Vidoo (born 1977), Danish singer and songwriter
- Sada Walkington, contestant on the first UK series of Big Brother
- Sada Williams (born 1997), Barbadian sprinter
- Sadha (born 1984), or Sadaa, Indian actress

=== Surname ===
- Daniel Sada (born 1953), Mexican writer
- Eugenio Garza Sada (1892–1973), Mexican businessman and philanthropist
- Masashi Sada (born 1952), Japanese folk singer
- Musa Mohammed Sada (born 1957), Nigerian politician
- Sotaro Sada (born 1984), Japanese football player
- Tokuhei Sada (1909–1933), Japanese swimmer
- Víctor Sada (born 1984), Spanish basketball player

== Places ==
Alphabetical by country

- Şada, Azerbaijan
- Sada, Mayotte, France
- Sada, Western Ghats, Goa, India
- Stadio Gino Alfonso Sada, a sports stadium in Italy
- Sada, Shimane, Japan
- Sadda, Khyber Pakhtunkhwa, Pakistan
- Sadda, Punjab, Pakistan
- Sada, Eastern Cape, South Africa
- Sada, Galicia, Spain
- Sada, Navarre, Spain
- Waddams Grove, Illinois, previously Sada, United States
- Saada, Yemen
- Saada Governorate, Yemen

== Other uses ==
- Sadeh, an Iranian winter festival
- Savannah Accelerated Development Authority
- Sayyid, an Islamic honorific
- Professor Sada, a character in Pokémon Scarlet

== See also ==
- Sadda (disambiguation)
- Sadeh (disambiguation)
