= Él =

Él may refer to:

- Él, 1926 autobiographical novel by Mercedes Pinto
- Él (visual novel), a 2000 Japanese adult visual novel
- Él (film), a Mexican film directed by Luis Buñuel, based upon the novel by Mercedes Pinto
- Él (album), 1982 album by Lucerito
- "Él" (Lucía song), the Spanish entry in the Eurovision Song Contest 1982, performed in Spanish by Lucía
- "Él", song by Mexican singer Fey from her 1999 album El Color de los Sueños
- Él Records, an independent record label from the UK founded by Mike Alway
- Él, a Spanish masculine pronoun

== See also ==
- El (disambiguation)
