= See-through display =

Display which can be seen through

An optical combiner for a see-through display

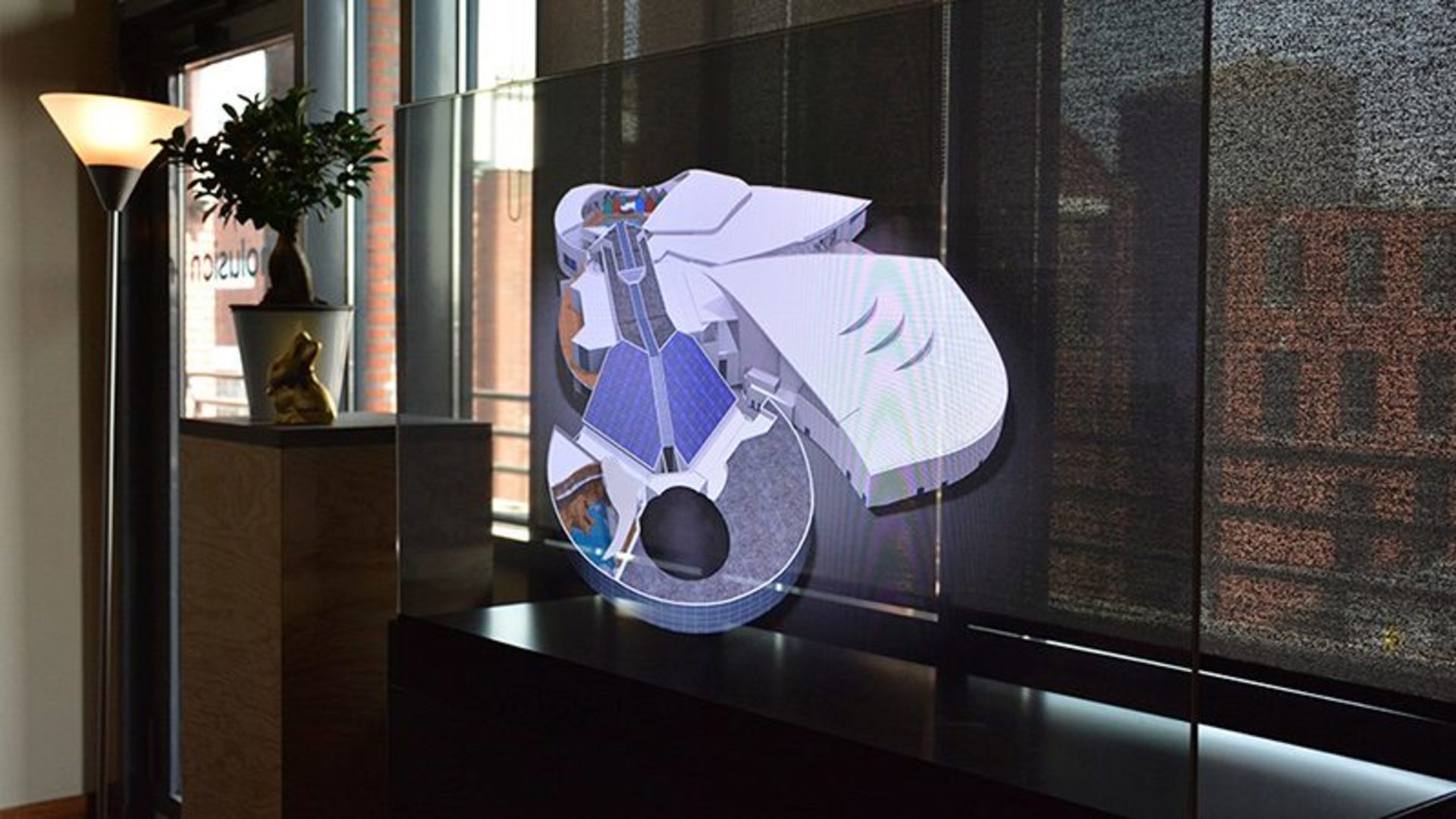
Transparent 55" OLED screen

A see-through display or transparent display is an electronic display that allows the user to see what is shown on the screen while still being able to see through it. The main applications of this type of display are in head-up displays, augmented reality systems, digital signage, and general large-scale spatial light modulation. They should be distinguished from image-combination systems which achieve visually similar effects by optically combining multiple images in the field of view. Transparent displays embed the active matrix of the display in the field of view, which generally allows them to be more compact than combination-based systems.

Broadly, there are two types of underlying transparent display technology, absorptive (chiefly LCDs) and emissive (chiefly electroluminescent, including LEDs and "high-field" emitters). Absorptive devices work by selectively reducing the intensity of the light passing through the display, while emissive devices selectively add to the light passing through the display. Some display systems combine both absorptive and emissive devices to overcome the limitations inherent to either one. Emissive display technologies achieve partial transparency either by interspersing invisibly small opaque emitter elements with transparent areas or by being partially transparent.

== History ==
The development of practical transparent displays accelerated rapidly around the end of first decade of the 21st century. An early commercial transparent display was the Sony Ericsson Xperia Pureness released in 2009, although it did not succeed in the market due to the screen not being visible outside or in brightly lit rooms. Samsung released their first transparent LCD in late 2011, and Planar published a report on a prototype electroluminescent transparent display in 2012. Not long after, UK-based Crystal Display Systems began to sell transparent LCDs remanufactured from conventional LCD displays. LG demonstrated a transparent LCD in 2015. In the later part of the 2010s, transparent OLEDs started to appear. LG, Prodisplay, and taptl, for example, use conventional LCD technology. LG also uses OLED technology. LUMINEQ transparent displays manufactured by Beneq are Thin Film Electroluminescent Displays enabled by Atomic layer deposition (ALD). This display technology was used by Valtra in 2017 to develop its SmartGlass Head-Up Display on tractors. Samsung and Planar Systems previously made transparent OLED displays but discontinued them in 2016. Prodisplay used both OLED and LCD technology, but no longer makes transparent OLED displays.

== How it works ==
There are two major see-through display technologies, LCD and LED. The LED technology is older and emitted a red color, OLED is newer than both using an organic substance. Though OLED see-through displays are becoming more widely available, both technologies are largely derivative from conventional display systems. In see-through displays, the difference between the absorptive nature of the LCD and emissive nature of the OLED gives them very different visual appearances. LCD systems impose a pattern of shading and colours on the background seen through the display, while OLED systems impose a glowing image pattern on the background. TASEL displays are essentially transparent thin-film Electroluminescent Displays with transparent electrodes.

Pixel Pitch and Brightness:

- Pixel Pitch: Different pixel pitches (the distance between pixels) affect image clarity. Smaller pixel pitches offer higher pixel densities, resulting in sharper images.
- Brightness: See-through displays have adjustable brightness levels. Higher brightness levels, up to 7500 nits (depending on the technology), ensure visibility in various lighting conditions, including direct sunlight.

=== Partial reflection ===
A partial reflection display shows an image by reflecting an image off a smooth transparent surface such as glass or specialty film.

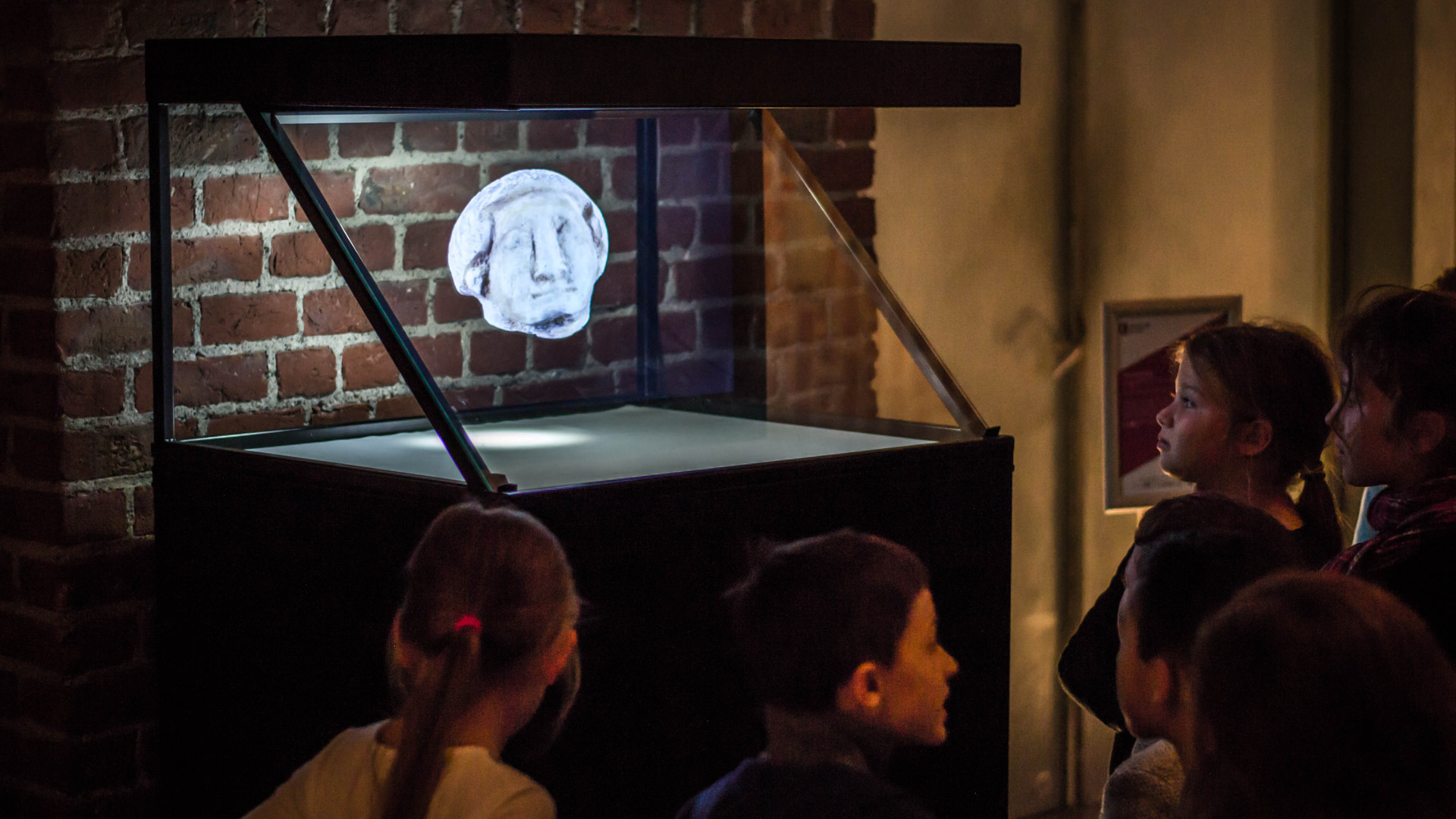
A device using a semi-reflective glass panel and a screen to create a see-through display

Partial reflection displays are comparatively simple but are limited by the brightness of the reflected image needing to be considerably brighter than the light sources beyond the display.

A common example of partial reflective displays is in the head-up displays of some aircraft. The Pepper's ghost illusion uses this technique passively.

=== LCD ===
An LCD panel can be made "see-through" without applied voltage when a twisted nematic LCD is fitted with crossed polarizers. Conventional LCDs have relatively low transmission efficiency due to the use of polarizers so that they tend to appear somewhat dim against natural light. Unlike LED see-through displays, LCD see-throughs do not produce their own light but only modulate incoming light. LCDs intended specifically for see-through displays are usually designed to have improved transmission efficiency. Small scale see-through LCDs have been commercially available for some time, but only recently have vendors begun to offer units with sizes comparable to LCD televisions and displays. Samsung released a specifically see-through designed 22-inch panel in 2011. As of 2016, they were being produced by Samsung, LG, and MMT, with a number of vendors offering products based on OEM systems from these manufacturers. An alternative approach to commercializing this technology is to offer conventional back-lit display systems without the backlight system. LCD displays often also require removing a diffuser layer to adapt them for use as transparent displays.

The key limitation to see-through LCD efficiency is its linear polarizing filters. An ideal linear polarizer absorbs half of the incoming unpolarized light. In LCDs, light has to pass two linear polarizers, either in the crossed or parallel-aligned configuration.

=== LED ===
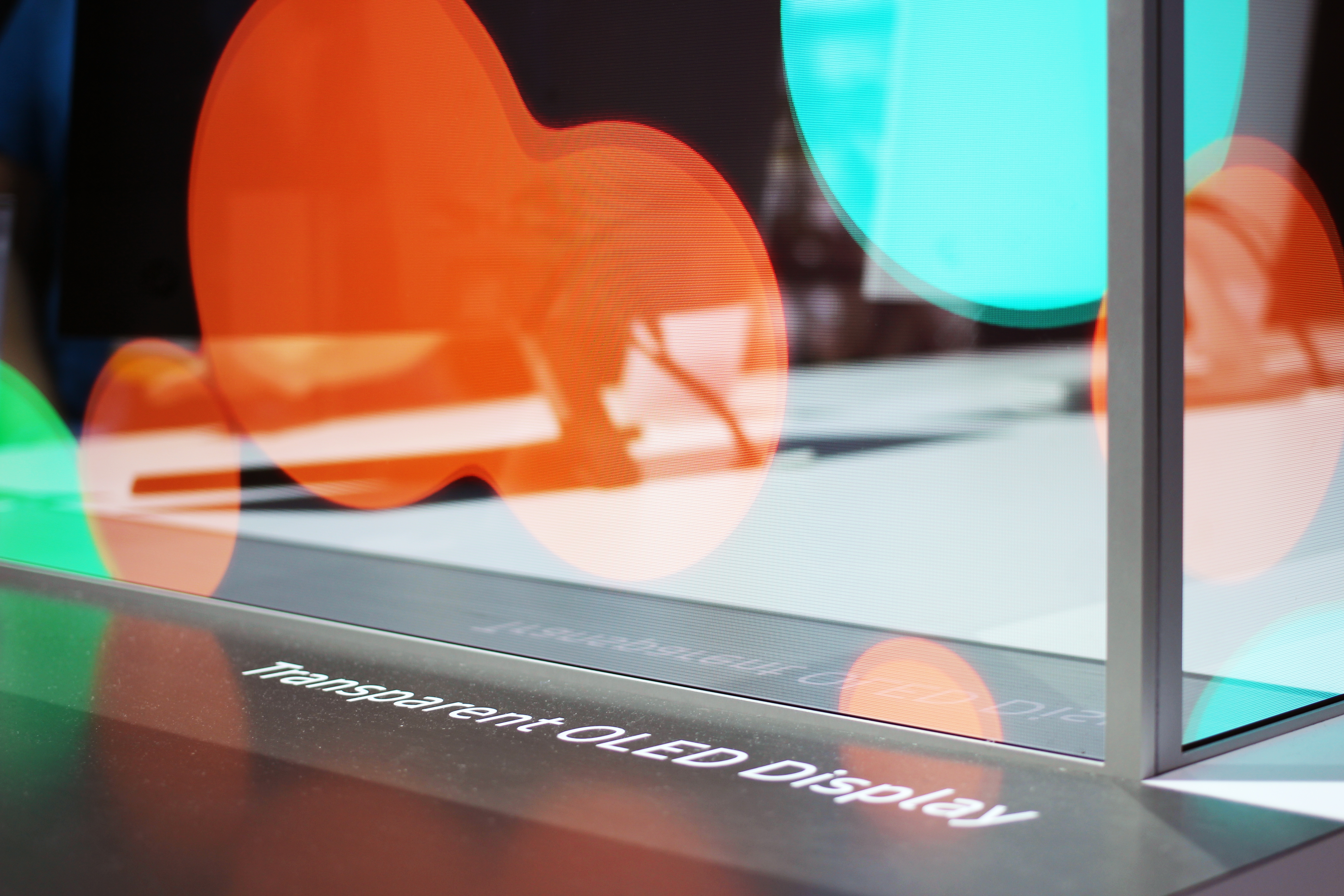
See-through OLED display

LED screens to have two layers of glass on both sides of a set of addressable LEDs. Both inorganic and organic (OLED) LEDs have been used for this purpose. The more flexible (literally and figuratively) OLEDs have generated more interest for this application, though as of July 2016 the only commercial manufacturer Samsung announced that the product would be discontinued. OLEDs consist of an emissive and conductive layer. Electrical impulses travel through the conductive layer and produce light at the emissive layer. This is different from LCDs in that OLEDs produce their own light, which produces a markedly different visual effect with a see-through display. The narrow gap between the pixels of the screen as well as the clear cathodes within allows the screens to be transparent. These types of the screen have been notoriously difficult and expensive to produce in the past, but are now becoming more common as the method of manufacturing them is advancing. OLED transparent displays generate their own light, but can not show black; this can be solved by the addition of a special LCD layer.

=== Passive transparent displays ===
MIT Researchers developed an inexpensive and passive transparent display system that uses nano-particles.

Unlike transparent LCDs and OLEDs that requires integrated electronic modules to process visual signals or emit their own light, a passive transparent display uses a projector as the external light source to project images and videos onto a transparent medium embedded with resonance nanoparticles that selectively scatter the projected light. This approach improves the deficiencies observed with transparent LCDs and OLEDs, such as high cost, difficulty of scaling in size, and delicate maintenance.

=== TASEL Displays ===
Lumineq TASEL displays are based on the Electroluminescent Display technology. The TASEL glass panel consists of a luminescent phosphorous layer sandwiched between two transparent electrodes layers. The display emits light by itself and has a transparency of 80%. Unlike LCDs and LEDs using organic materials that will be effected by environments, TASEL displays are inorganic and immune to environments. One of the disadvantages of TASEL displays was not being capable of displaying more than one colour.

== Applications ==
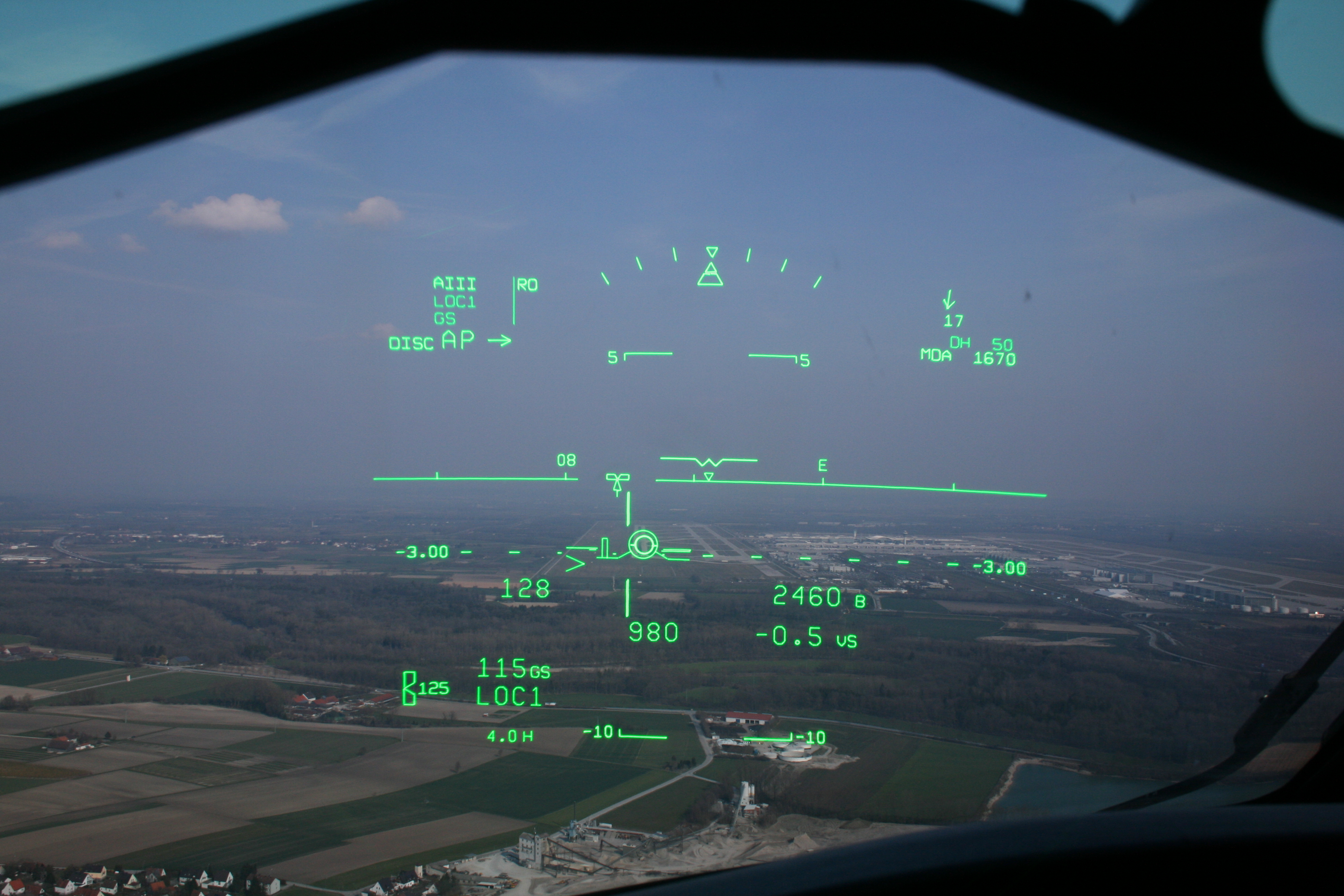
Head-up display in an aircraft

See-through displays can be used for:

1. Brick-and-Mortar Store Windows: These displays offer highly effective advertising by transforming storefronts into dynamic visual experiences. This can be particularly advantageous for ad exchange platforms due to their high CPMs resulting from their effectiveness.
2. Billboards: Transparent displays on billboards allow creative advertising agencies to design ads that seamlessly blend video content with the background, creating eye-catching and innovative advertising campaigns.
3. Large Building Facades: Building owners can utilize transparent displays on facades to generate significant revenue through advertisements. These displays do not obstruct the view for residents, as the displays are transparent, maintaining the visibility of the outside scenery from inside the building.
4. Augmented reality, and other applications such as shopping displays and more sophisticated computer screens.

See-through displays based on OLED or microLED technology may display black through the addition of an LCD, as they cannot do it on their own. This is because, in OLED and micro-LED, the OFF state corresponds to black (or in this case, transparent since there is no black background) and the ON state corresponds to white; this is because OLED and microLED pixels emit their own light. See-through LCDs cannot display whites because LCD pixels do not emit their own light, rather they selectively block light from a white backlight, although this could theoretically be fixed though the addition of a transparent monochrome microLED or OLED display. In LCDs, this is because, in the OFF state, the pixels turn off, allowing light from a backlight to pass through, while in the ON state, the pixels turn on, blocking light.

MIT Researchers were working on creating Transparent Displays inexpensively using nano-particles. As of 2019, the MIT research was being commercialized by a startup company, Lux Labs, Inc.

=== Augmented reality ===
See-through screens are an emerging market that has several potential uses. Cell phones, tablets and other devices are starting to use this technology. It has an appealing appearance but more importantly it is also effective for augmented reality applications. The device can add its own twist to what is behind the screen. For example, if you look through a tablet with a see-through display at a street, the device could overlay the name of the street onto the screen. It could be similar to Google street view, except in real-time. For example, Google Translate has a feature that allows the user to point the camera at a sign or writing in another language and it automatically displays the same view, but with the writing in the language of your choosing. This could be possible with see-through displays as well.

A device using a transparent display will have much higher resolution and will display much more realistic augmented reality than video augmented reality, which takes video, adds its own supplement to it, and then displays that onto the screen. It could be simpler to display the addition onto the see-through screen instead. The Microsoft HoloLens is an application of this idea.

=== Retail ===
These displays are also used in shop windows. The shopping windows show the product on the inside as well as show text or advertisements on the glass. This type of showcase is becoming more popular as see-through screens are becoming cheaper and more available.

=== Event stage ===
A transparent LED display can be used by stage designers and event producers to realize creative holographic-like visual effects.

== See also ==
- Head-up display
- Pepper's ghost
