= Sadda =

Sadda may refer to:

- Sadda, Khyber Pakhtunkhwa, a town in Kurram District, KPK
- Sadda, Punjab, a town and Union Council of Kasur District in Punjab, Pakistan
- Sad-dar, a Persian treatise written as a summary of Zoroastrian beliefs (romanized sadda in some works)

== See also ==
- Sada (disambiguation)
- Sadeh (disambiguation)
