= AstraDome =

Car instrument in 1960s

The AstraDome was a unique, futuristic instrument cluster introduced by Chrysler Motors in its 1960 product line through 1962. It was offered only in Chrysler branded vehicles, like the Chrysler 300-F, G and H. All gauges were positioned in three dimensions under a single dome cluster. Because the gauge cluster extended toward the steering wheel, automatic transmission gear selector levers and turn signal indicators that had traditionally been located on the steering column were installed to the left of the cluster as pushbutton controls for the transmission and a sliding lever directly below the transmission controls for the turn signal. Control knobs were installed at the base of the cluster that were labeled "Rear Window" and "Map Light" on the left side and "Dome Light" and "Antenna" on the right side.

The panel featured a nonglare electroluminescent illumination system combining red needles and numerals that glowed green. The lighting system was marketed as "panelescent."

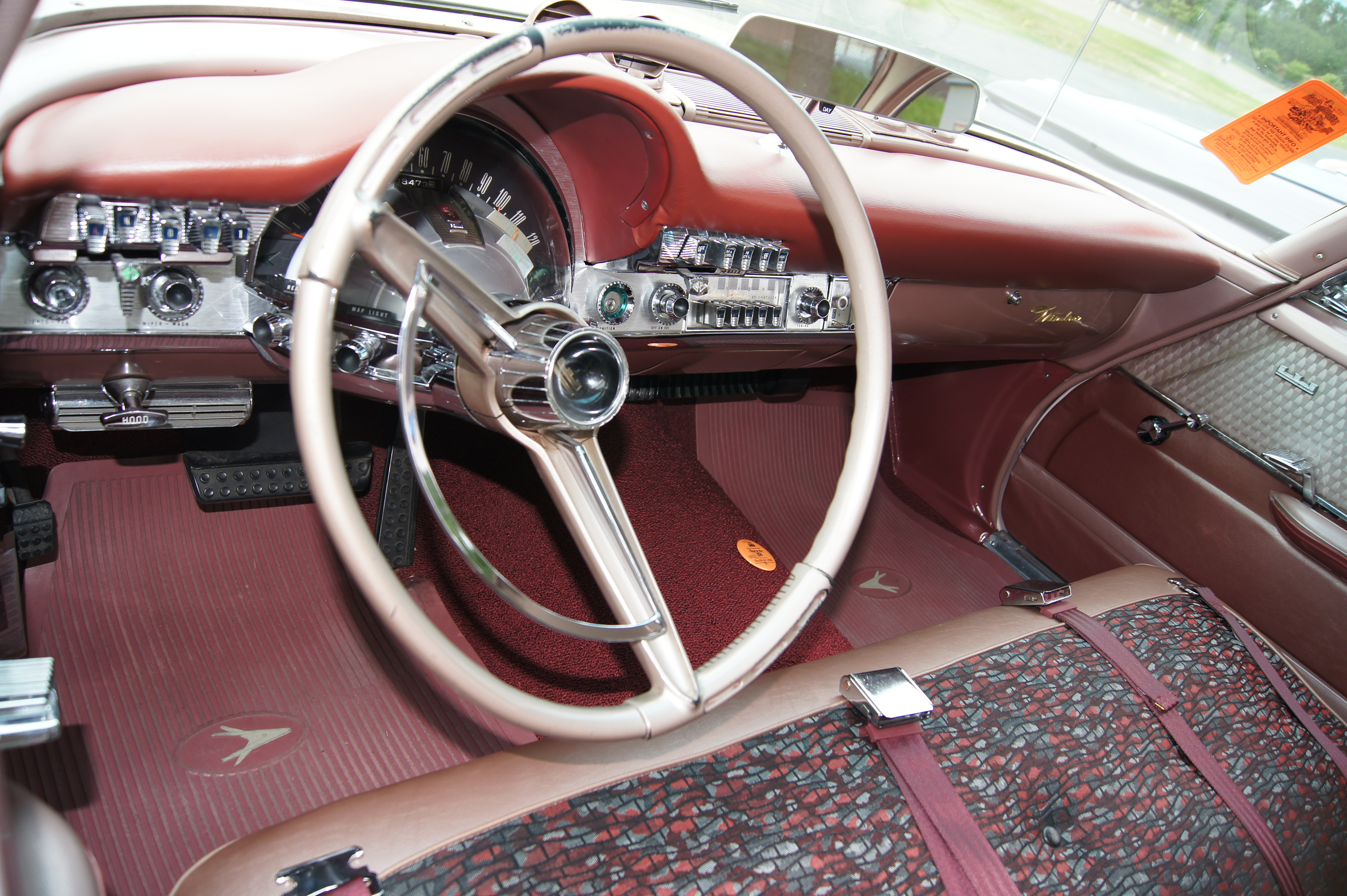
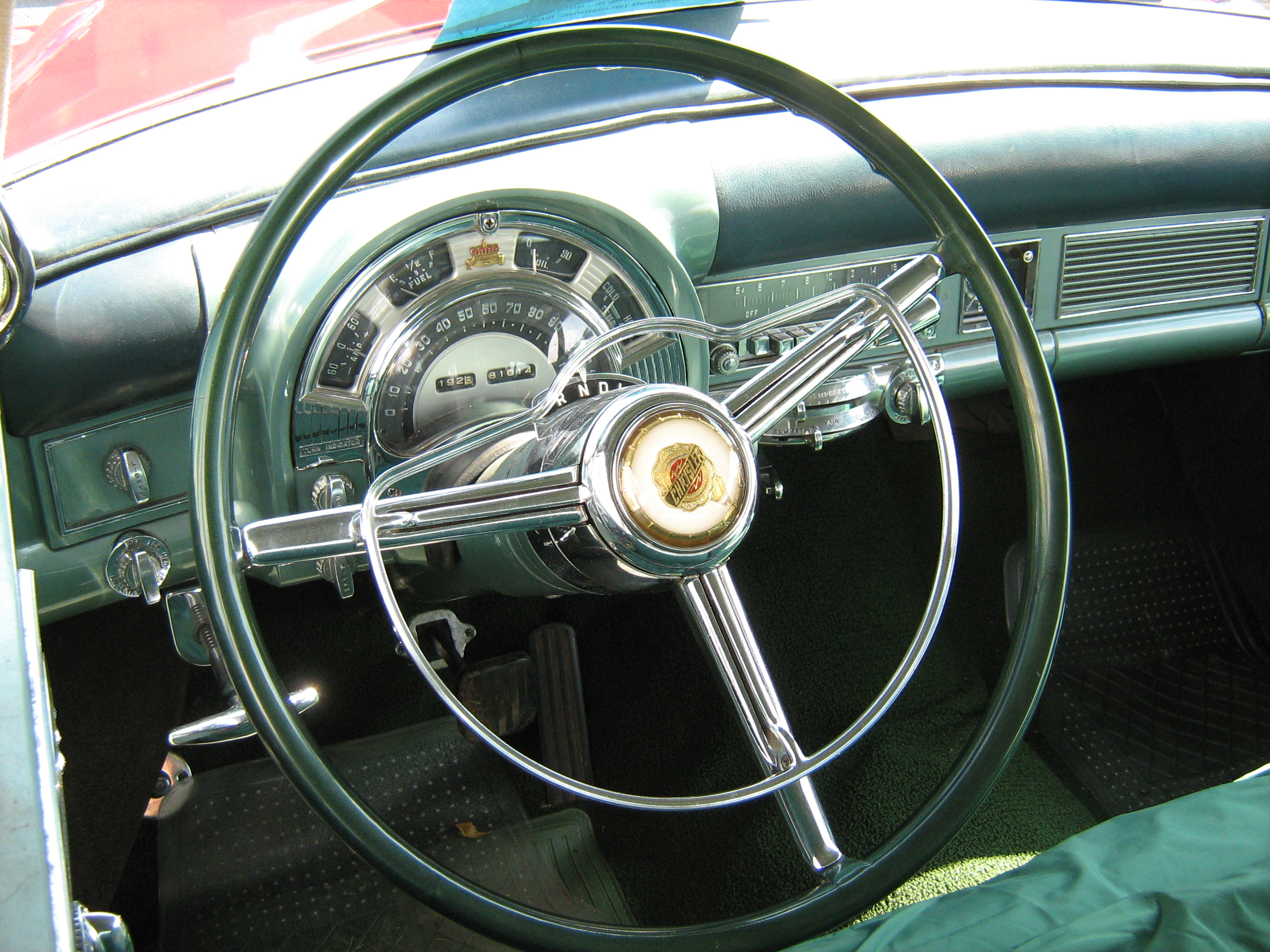
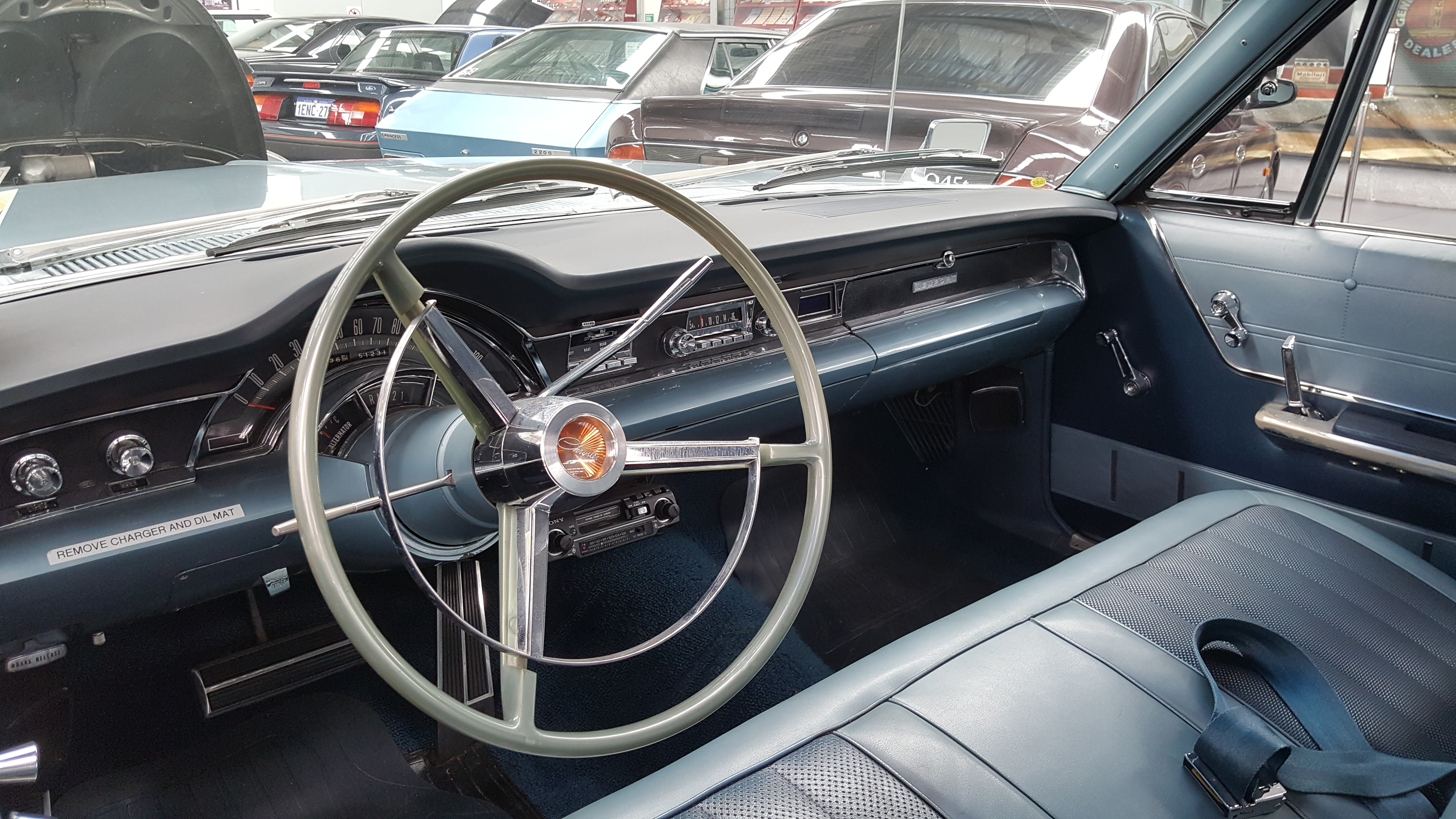
It was a design improvement from an instrument gauge used from 1949 until 1954 on all Chrysler branded vehicles, while adding a futuristic appearance. The approach was introduced again for 1965 and 1966 with a half-circle speedometer with gauges included below but did not extend out toward the steering wheel.

== Vehicles installed ==
- Chrysler 300
- Chrysler New Yorker
- Chrysler Town and Country
- Chrysler Windsor
- Chrysler Saratoga
- Chrysler Newport
