= ELB =

ELB may refer to:

- Ellinair, a Greek airline
- Étranges Libellules, a defunct French video game developer
- Euro League Baseball
- Las Flores Airport (Colombia)
- Education and Library Board, now part of the Education Authority of Northern Ireland
