= Sade =

Sade may refer to:

- Sade (name)

== Films ==
- Sade (film) (2000), a French film starring Daniel Auteuil as the Marquis de Sade

== Music ==
- Sade (band), a British band headed by the singer Sade
- Sade (singer) (born 1959, Helen Folasade Adu), British-Nigerian musician and lead singer of the band Sade
- "Sade", a song from the album Duotones (1986) by Kenny G, composed as a tribute to the band Sade
- "Sade" (Adekunle Gold song), a single from the album Gold (2016) by Adekunle Gold
- "Sade", a song from the album I Might Forgive... But I Don't Forget (2023) by Jeezy

== Other uses ==
- Sade, Solapur district, a village in Maharashtra, India
- Sadeh (disambiguation)
- Tsade, a letter in several Semitic languages
- Società Adriatica di Elettricità, bought by Montedison in the 1960s
