= Sade (name) =

Sade is a given name and a surname. Notable people with the name include:

== Given name ==
- Lorrainne Sade Baskerville, American social worker, activist, and trans woman
- Sade (singer) (born 1959, Helen Folasade Adu), British Nigerian musician and lead singer of the eponymous band
- Sade Adeniran (born 1960s), Nigerian novelist
- Sade Baderinwa (born 1969), American, WABC-TV Eyewitness News correspondent and anchor
- Sade Bimantara
- Sade Daal, Surinamese swimmer
- Sade Elhawary, community organizer and member of the California State Assembly
- Sade Fritschi
- Sade Gawanas, Namibian politician
- Sade Lythcott
- Sade McCreath
- Sade Robinson, college student who was killed and dismembered in Milwaukee in 2024
- Sade Sealy (born 18 November 1991) is a Barbadian athlete

== Surname ==
- Marcel de Sade, (1934–2025), Danish criminal
- Marquis de Sade (1740–1814), French aristocrat, writer, and libertine; namesake of the word sadism
- Dűrrũ Sade (1902–1979), Turkish wrestler
- Enn Säde, Estonian film sound designer and film director
- Francis Sade
- Idan Sade, Israeli footballer
- Ilan Sadé, Israel-born Swedish lawyer, debater, and politician
- Jacob Sadé, Israeli otolaryngologist
- Joseph Sade, American wrestler
- Mara Sadè, ring name of Jakara Jackson, American professional wrestler
- Orly Sade, Israeli economist
- Sandra Sade, Israeli actress
- Selinnur Sade, Turkish swimmer
- Shay Sade, Israeli footballer
- Tanc Sade (born 28 July 1980) is an Australian actor, writer and director
- Toshiko Sade, Japanese tennis player

== See also ==
- Sadeh (disambiguation)
