= Eastern Football League =

Eastern Football League may refer to:

- Eastern Football League (Australia), an Australian rules football league in Melbourne operating since 1903
- Eastern Football League (Scotland), a "non-league" football (soccer) competition in Scotland which ran 1891–1946
- Eastern Football League (1961-), a semi-pro American football league in which the Albany Metro Mallers played
- Eastern League of Professional Football (1926-1927), a minor professional American football league

== See also ==
- Eastern League (disambiguation)
