= Nightlight =

Small light fixture used to provide dim illumination during the night

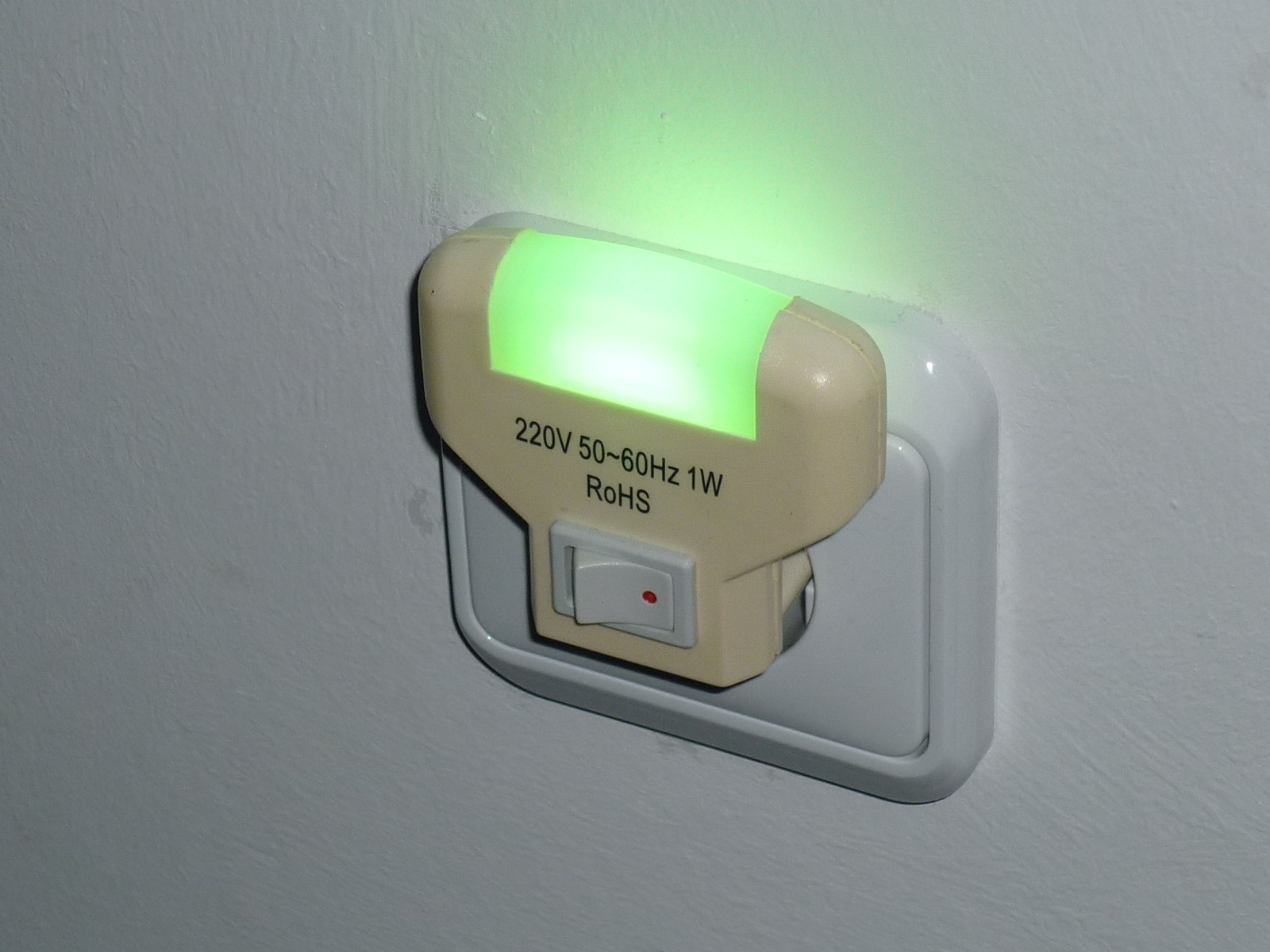
An LED nightlight

A nightlight is a small light fixture, usually electrical, placed for comfort or convenience in dark areas or areas that may become dark at certain times, such as at night or during an emergency. Small long-burning candles serving a similar function are referred to as "tealights".

== Uses and cultures ==
People usually use nightlights for the sense of security which having a light on provides, or to relieve fear of the dark, especially in young children. Nightlights are also useful to the general public by revealing the general layout of a room without requiring a major light to be switched on, for avoiding tripping over stairs, obstacles, or pets, or to mark an emergency exit. Exit signs often use tritium radioluminescence. In homes, nightlights are usually placed in bathrooms, kitchens and hallways to avoid turning on the main light fixture, especially late at night.

Some frequent travelers carry small nightlights for temporary installation in their guestroom and bathroom, to avoid tripping or falls in an unfamiliar nighttime environment. Gerontologists have recommended use of nightlights to help prevent falls, which can often be life-threatening to the elderly.

The low cost of nightlights has enabled a proliferation of different decorative designs, some featuring superheroes, cartoon characters and fantastical designs, while others feature the basic simplicity of a small luminous disc.

The 1990 song "Birdhouse in Your Soul" by They Might Be Giants is a song sung from the perspective of a nightlight.

== Light source and variants ==
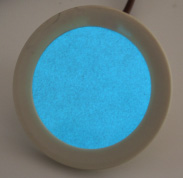
Electroluminescent nightlights use little electrical power

Early electrical nightlights used small incandescent lamps or small neon lamps to provide light, and were much safer than small candles using an open flame. The neon versions consumed very little energy and had a long life, but had a tendency to flicker on and off (reminiscent of a candle), which some users liked and others found annoying. In the 1960s, small nightlights appeared that featured a low-power electroluminescent panel emitting soft green or blue light; similar lights are still available today.

Some nightlights include a photocell, which enables them to switch off when the ambient light is sufficiently bright. Other designs also feature a built-in passive infrared sensor to detect motion, and only switch on when somebody is passing by in the dark. With the availability of low-cost LEDs, many different variants have become available, featuring different colours, sometimes changing automatically or in a user-controllable way.

== Safety hazard ==
The US Consumer Product Safety Commission, or UCPSC, reports it receives about 10 reports per year where nightlights close to flammable materials were cited as responsible for fires; they recommend the use of nightlights with LED bulbs cooler and more energy efficient than the 4 or 7 watt incandescent light bulbs still used in some older nightlights.

== Potential health issues and benefits ==
A University of Pennsylvania study indicated that sleeping with the light on or with a nightlight was associated with a greater incidence of nearsightedness in children. However, a later study at Ohio State University contradicted the earlier conclusion. Both studies were published in the journal Nature.

Another study has indicated that sleeping with the light on may protect the eyes of diabetics from retinopathy, a condition that can lead to blindness. However, the initial study is still inconclusive.

The optimal sleeping light condition is said by some to be total darkness. If a nightlight is used within a sleeping area, it is recommended to choose a dim reddish or amber light to minimize disruptive effects on sleep cycles. In addition, nightlights may be useful in locations other than sleeping areas, such as hallways, bathrooms, or kitchens, to allow late night trips to be made without turning on the full light, while preserving a dark sleeping environment.
