= Electroluminescent wire =

Capacitive light source in the form of a wire

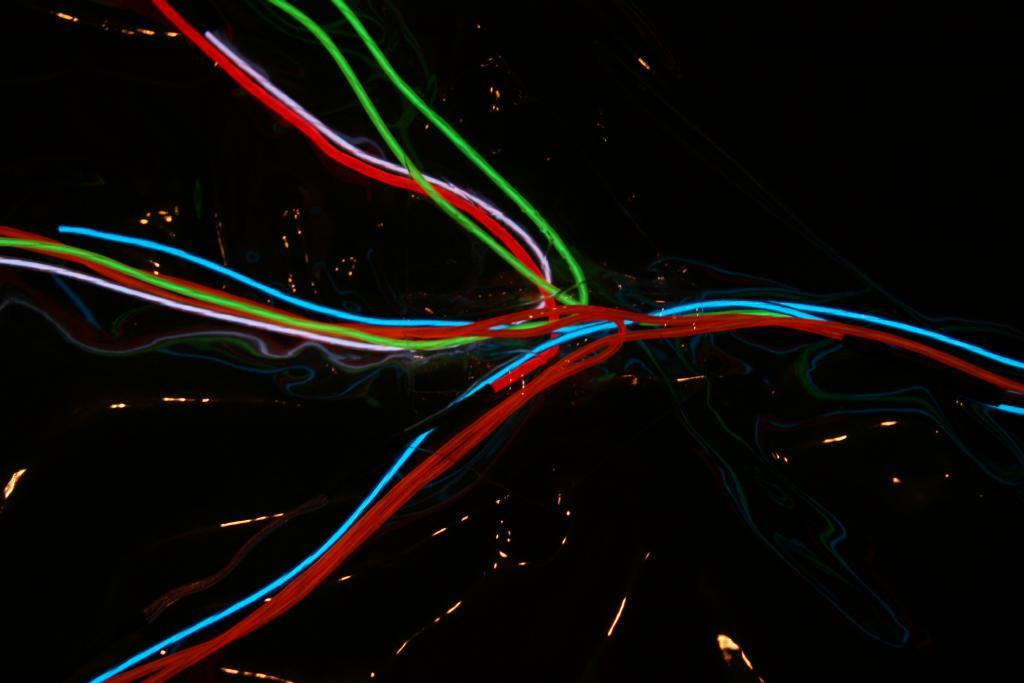
Close up of El-Wire of a variety of colors

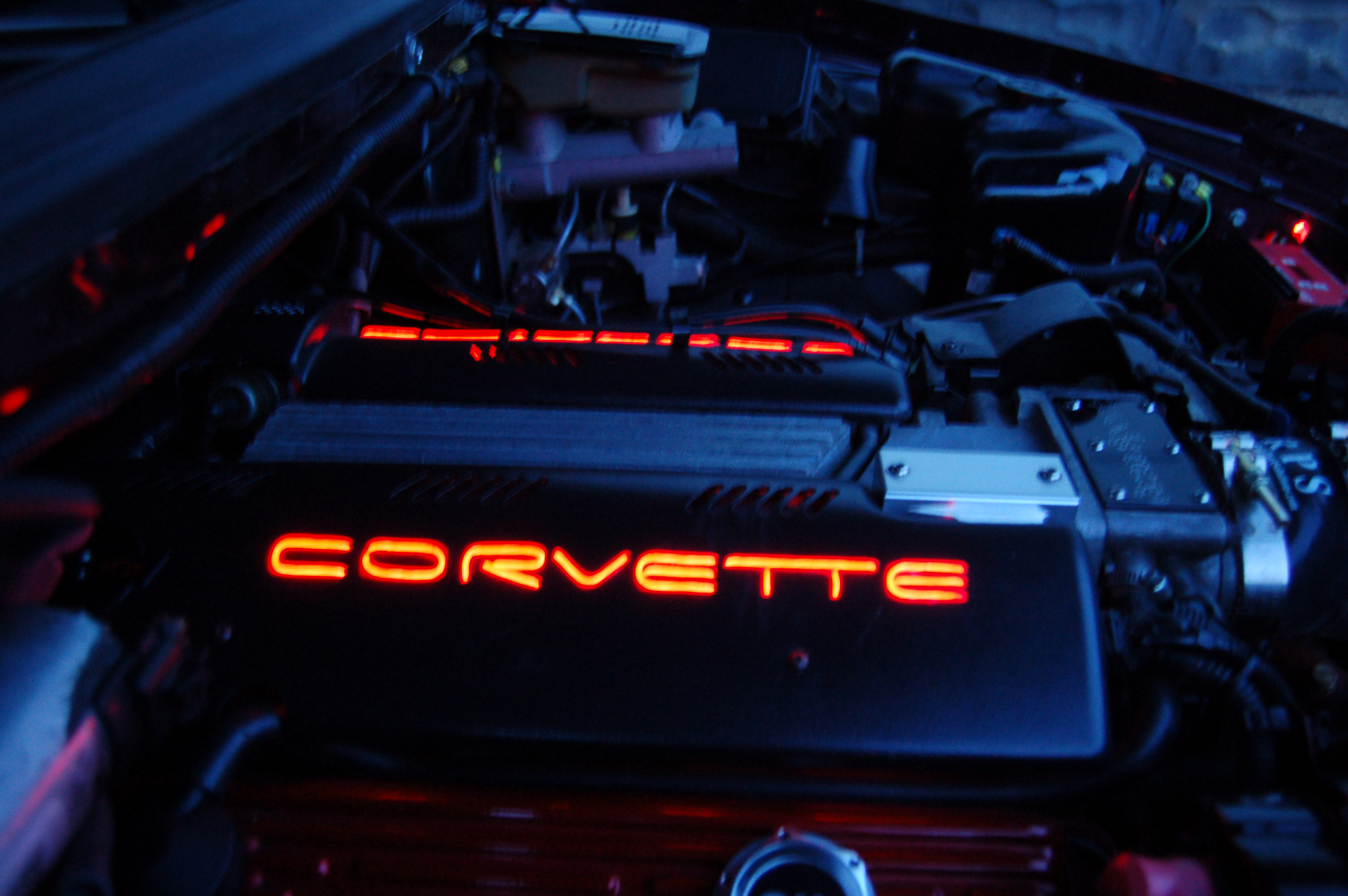
El-Wire Project

Electroluminescent wire (often abbreviated as EL wire) is a thin copper wire coated in a phosphor that produces light through electroluminescence when an alternating current is applied to it. It can be used in a wide variety of applications—vehicle and structure decoration, safety and emergency lighting, toys, clothing etc.—much as rope light or Christmas lights are often used. Unlike these types of strand lights, EL wire is not a series of points, but produces a continuous unbroken line of visible light. Its thin diameter makes it flexible and ideal for use in a variety of applications such as clothing or costumes.

== Structure ==
EL wire's construction consists of five major components. First is a solid-copper wire core coated with phosphor. A very fine wire or pair of wires is spiral-wound around the phosphor-coated copper core and then the outer Indium tin oxide (ITO) conductive coating is evaporated on. This fine wire is electrically isolated from the copper core. Surrounding this "sandwich" of copper core, phosphor and fine copper wire is a clear PVC sleeve. Finally, surrounding this thin and clear PVC sleeve is another clear, colored translucent or fluorescent PVC sleeve.

Diagram of El-Wire

An alternating current electric potential of approximately 90 to 120 volts at about 1000 Hz is applied between the copper core wire and the fine wire that surrounds the copper core. The wire can be modeled as a coaxial capacitor with about 1 nF of capacitance per 30 cm, and the rapid charging and discharging of this capacitor excites the phosphor to emit light. The colors of light that can be produced efficiently by phosphors are limited, so many types of wire use an additional fluorescent organic dye in the clear PVC sleeve to produce the final result. These organic dyes produce colors like red and purple when excited by the blue-green light of the core.

A resonant oscillator is typically used to generate the high voltage drive signal. Because of the capacitance load of the EL wire, using an inductive (coiled) transformer makes the driver a very efficient tuned LC oscillator. The efficiency of EL wire is very high, and thus up to a hundred meters of EL wire can be driven by AA batteries for several hours.

In recent years, the LC circuit has been replaced for some applications with a single chip switched capacitor inverter IC such as the Supertex HV850; this can run 30 cm of angel hair wire at high efficiency, and is suitable for solar lanterns and safety applications. The other advantage of these chips is that the control signals can be derived from a microcontroller, so brightness and colour can be varied programmatically; this can be controlled by using external sensors that sense, for example, battery state, ambient temperature, or ambient light etc.

EL wire - in common with other types of EL devices - does have limitations: at high frequency it dissipates a lot of heat, and that can lead to breakdown and loss of brightness over time. Because the wire is unshielded and typically operates at a relatively high voltage, EL wire can produce high-frequency interference (corresponding to the frequency of the oscillator) that can be picked up by sensitive audio equipment, such as guitar pickups. There is also a voltage limit: typical EL wire breaks down at around 180 volts peak-to-peak, so if using an unregulated transformer, back-to-back zener diodes and series current-limiting resistors are essential.

In addition, EL sheet and wire can sometimes be used as a touch sensor, since compressing the capacitor will change its value.

== Sequencers ==
EL wire sequencers can flash electroluminescent wire, or EL wire, in sequential patterns. EL wire requires a low-power, high-frequency driver to cause the wire to illuminate. Most EL wire drivers simply light up one strand of EL wire in a constant-on mode, and some drivers may additionally have a blink or strobe mode. A sound-activated driver will light EL wire in synchronization to music, speech, or other ambient sound, but an EL wire sequencer will allow multiple lengths of EL wire to be flashed in a desired sequence. The lengths of EL wire can all be the same color, or a variety of colors.

10- Channel Sequencer connected to EL wire sign. (Phone number obscured)	Same EL wire sign with sequencer activated. (Phone number obscured)

The images above show a sign that displays a telephone number, where the numbers were formed using different colors of EL wire. There are ten numbers, each of which is connected to a different channel of the EL wire sequencer. (Note: The telephone number has been obscured in both photos in order to comply with Wikipedia guidelines.)

Like EL wire drivers, sequencers are rated to drive (or power) a range or specific length of EL wire. For example, using a sequencer rated for 1.5 to 14 meters (4.9 to 45.9 feet), if less than 1.5m is used, there is a risk of burning out the sequencer, and if more than 14m is used, the EL wire will not light as brightly as intended.

There are commercially available EL wire sequencers capable of lighting three, four, five, or ten lengths of EL wire. There are professional and experimental sequencers with many more than ten channels, but for most applications, ten channels is enough. Sequencers usually have options for changing the speed, reversing, changing the order of the sequence, and sometimes for changing whether the first wires remain lit or go off as the rest of the wires in the sequence are lit. EL wire sequencers tend to be smaller than a pack of cigarettes and most are powered by batteries. This versatility lends to the sequencers' use at nighttime events where mains electricity is not available.

=== Applications ===
By arranging each strand of EL wire into a shape slightly different from the previous one, it is possible to create animations using EL wire sequencers. EL wire sequencers are also used for costumes and have been used to create animations on various items such as kimono, purses, neckties, and motorcycle tanks. They are increasingly popular among artists, dancers, maker culture, and similar creative communities, such as exhibited in the annual Burning Man alt-culture festival.
