= Galvanoluminescence =

Light produced by passing electric current through an appropriate electrolyte

Galvanoluminescence is luminescence produced by the passage of an electric current through an appropriate electrolyte in which an electrode, made of certain metals such as aluminium or tantalum, has been immersed. One example is electrolysis with aluminum electrodes in sodium bicarbonate solution.

== See also ==
- Electroluminescence – Optical and electrical phenomenon
- List of light sources – Devices and processes that produce light
