= Sada Tomlinson =

American nurse

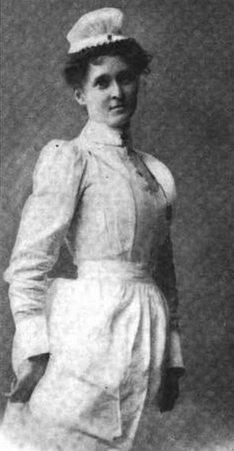
- Sada C. Tomlinson, from a 1907 publication
- Born: Sarah Collins Tomlinson; September 18, 1876; Sewanee, Tennessee, U.S.
- Died: March 6, 1953 (age 76); Saratoga Springs, New York, U.S.
- Occupations: Nurse, missionary

Sarah "Sada" Collins Tomlinson (September 18, 1876 – March 6, 1953) was an American nurse. From 1907 to 1936, she was a medical missionary in China, including a stint as the superintendent of a nursing school in Anqing.

== Early life and education ==
Tomlinson was born in Sewanee, Tennessee, the daughter of William H. Tomlinson and Cordelia E. Jones Tomlinson. She lived in Nashville as a young woman. She graduated from the Boston City Hospital Training School for Nurses in 1902. She took more coursework at Teachers College, Columbia University, during a furlough in 1919 and 1920.

== Career ==
After nursing school, Tomlinson was attached to the Henry Street Settlement and St. George's parish in New York City. She became a missionary nurse in 1907, when she joined the staff at St. James's Hospital in Anqing, China. She returned to the United States in late 1909 when her mother was ill. While home she spoke to women's groups and to a national convention of nurses about her work. After her return to China in 1913, Tomlinson became head of the Nurse Training School at the St. James Hospital. She taught in Chinese.

Tomlinson was a member of the League of Women Voters. She was a founding member of the Nurses' Association of China in 1915, and was elected a committee chair at the association's annual conference in 1924. She retired from her mission work in Anqing in 1936.

== Publications ==
- "Opportunities for Nursing in China" (1910)
- "Training Nurses in a Chinese Hospital" (1926)

== Personal life ==
Tomlinson spent her later years in New England, as companion to Emma Josephine Brazier. She died in March 1953, at the age of 76, in Saratoga Springs, New York.
