= Eastern League =

Eastern League may refer to:

== Baseball in the United States ==
Most recent leagues listed first

- Eastern League (1938–present), a minor league established in 1923 and renamed Eastern League in 1938; Double-A since 1963
- Eastern League (1916–1932), a minor league that last operated at the Class B and Class A levels
- Eastern League (1892–1911), operating name of the International League before 1912
- Eastern League (1884–1887), a minor league that was absorbed into the International League

== Other uses ==
- Eastern League (Japanese baseball), one of two professional baseball minor leagues in Japan
- Eastern Football Netball League, an Australian rules football league
- Eastern Football League (Scotland), a Scottish non-league football league
- Eastern Professional Basketball League, an early name of the Continental Basketball Association
- Eastern Professional Soccer League (1928–29), an American soccer league
- Eastern Hockey League, an American professional ice hockey minor league

== See also ==
- Eastern Football League (disambiguation)
