= Él (film) =

1953 film by Luis Buñuel

- Film poster
- Directed by: Luis Buñuel
- Screenplay by: Luis Buñuel; Luis Alcoriza
- Story by: Pensamientos by Mercedes Pinto
- Produced by: Óscar Dancigers
- Starring: Arturo de Córdova; Delia Garcés; Luis Beristáin
- Cinematography: Gabriel Figueroa
- Edited by: Carlos Savage
- Music by: Luis Hernández Bretón
- Release date: 9 July 1953 (Mexico)
- Running time: 92 minutes
- Country: Mexico
- Language: Spanish
- Box office: $19,359

Él, (also stylized El and EL, (Note: The name of the film is written as EL on the poster and “El“ [sic] (in non-joining cursive) on the film's title card.) and released in the US as This Strange Passion) is a 1953 Mexican film by Luis Buñuel based upon the novel by Mercedes Pinto. The film explores several of Buñuel's signature cinematic themes, most notably a romance warped by a bourgeois husband's obsessive paranoia, interspersed with distinct surrealist touches. The film was entered into the 1953 Cannes Film Festival.

== Plot ==
The film opens on Good Friday during a traditional foot-washing ceremony. Francisco, an affluent and seemingly upstanding conservative, is instantly captivated by a beautiful young woman named Gloria. Consumed by a sudden obsession, he spends subsequent mornings searching for her in the same church. When he finally corners her, Gloria insists they cannot speak, but Francisco undeterred, tracks her to a restaurant. There, he discovers she is meeting Raúl—a close friend of his.

When Raúl casually reveals that he and Gloria are engaged, Francisco secretly plots to steal her away. He orchestrates an elegant party to flaunt his high social standing and charm. Though Gloria is initially wary of his sudden intrusion into her life, she ultimately succumbs to his sophisticated veneer and accepts his courtship.

The narrative then shifts to the future. Raúl, driving through the city, accidentally crosses paths with a visibly distressed Gloria. As she opens up to him, the film transitions into an extended flashback detailing the horrific reality of her marriage.

Behind closed doors, Francisco is a man consumed by intense paranoia and pathological jealousy. Compounding his mental instability, Francisco is locked in a stressful property lawsuit that heightens his agitation. Meanwhile, despite her total innocence, Gloria is entirely isolated. Her mother refuses to believe such a respected community figure could be abusive and Father Velasco, admonishes Gloria for her "untoward" behavior, vouching for Francisco's purity. When Francisco discovers Gloria confided in the priest, he subjects her to a terrifying mock execution, shooting her with a revolver loaded with blanks to "teach her a lesson." This burst of violence is then followed by a temporary period of warmth and remorse. The peace is short-lived. During a trip to a church bell tower, Francisco's facade slips entirely. Looking down at the street, he launches into a misanthropic tirade and turns his rage abruptly on Gloria. He apparently attempts to strangle her, threatening to hurl her over the railing. Gloria narrowly escapes—bringing the flashback full circle to her chance encounter with Raúl.

Raúl urges her to leave him, but when Gloria returns home to pack, Francisco discovers Raúl dropped her off. The cycle of jealousy reignites. Though he briefly seeks reconciliation after realizing she never had a physical affair, his fury returns when Gloria admits she confided their marital problems to Raúl.

That night, Francisco's psychosis reaches a breaking point as he attempts to bind and mutilate Gloria in her sleep. Her screams startle him, causing him to retreat to his room in a broken, weeping heap as he realizes he is losing control of his actions. By morning, Gloria has fled for good. Armed with his revolver, Francisco frantically hunts for her. Spotting what he believes to be Gloria and Raúl in a car, he pursues them back to the very church where he first saw her. Inside, he realizes the couple is actually a pair of strangers.

Plunging into total madness, Francisco hallucinates that the entire congregation—including the priest—is mocking him. He charges the altar in a manic frenzy and attacks the priest. Even as the congregation subdues him, the priest pities him, shouting, "Don't hurt him, he's my friend; he's gone mad!"

Years later, Gloria and Raúl visit a peaceful monastery with their young son. It is revealed that the monks have taken Francisco in. Gloria and Raúl choose to avoid him, but it is revealed that they have named their son Francisco. After they leave, the head monk informs Francisco of their visit. Francisco calmly notes that the boy is clearly Raúl and Gloria's, quietly murmuring, "Time has proven my point." "But to what avail?" The film closes on Francisco wandering down a monastery path and disappearing into a dark doorway.

== Cast ==
- Arturo de Córdova as Francisco Galván de Montemayor
- Delia Garcés as Gloria Vilalta
- Aurora Walker as Doña Esperanza Vilalta
- Carlos Martínez Baena as Padre Velasco
- Manuel Dondé as Pablo
- Rafael Banquells as Ricardo Luján
- Fernando Casanova as Lic. Beltrán
- Luis Beristáin as Raúl Conde

== Production ==
After completing the initial filming of Adventures of Robinson Crusoe and its release being indefinitely delayed, Buñuel decided to adapt Mercedes Pinto's novel Pensamientos about a paranoid husband. Buñuel also added personal memories of his sister Conchita's paranoid husband, who once mistakenly thought he saw Buñuel making vulgar faces at him on the street and went home to get his gun until his family finally convinced him that Buñuel was living in Zaragoza at the time. Buñuel acknowledged autobiographical elements in the film and stated that "it may be the film I put the most of myself into. There is something of me in the protagonist."

Buñuel later complained about how fast he was forced to shoot the film and that he wanted to remake it. He stated that "I did what I did in most of my Mexican films. They proposed a subject to me and instead of it, I made a counter-offer which, though still commercial, seemed more propitious for examining the things that interested me." Buñuel's producer hired Yucatán-born Mexican actor Arturo de Córdova for the lead role of Francisco Galvan de Montemayor. De Córdova had previously been a Hollywood star in swashbuckling roles, but his heavy Bronx accent often hindered his performances. Buñuel playfully has a cameo in the film's last scene as a priest.

== Reception ==
Él was a critical and financial disappointment, and many audience members in Mexico laughed during the film. Buñuel later stated that he was disappointed by the film overall, but proud that French psychoanalyst Jacques Lacan was known to screen the film for his students as an example of paranoia.

In recent years, the reputation of Él has considerably increased; the film holds a 100% approval rating on Rotten Tomatoes, and the French magazine Cahiers du Cinéma named it one of the 100 essential films of all time.

The film was ranked number 7 in the list of the Best 100 Mexican films of all time according to 25 cinema critics (1994/2020).

== Influence on Lacan's Psychoanalysis ==
Jacques Lacan, the French psychoanalyst, screened this film during his classes and seminars. For him, the film *Él* was a portrait of paranoia and the so-called Othello syndrome.

Lacan said of Buñuel: "We have forbidden ourselves from saying a word about what Sade lacks here. One must sense it in the gradation of *Philosophy*—where the curved needle, facing Buñuel's heroes, is ultimately destined to resolve the *penisneid* [penis envy] in the daughter that arises somewhat at that point."
