= Sade Bimantara =

Indonesian diplomat (born 1973)

Ida Bagus Made Bimantara
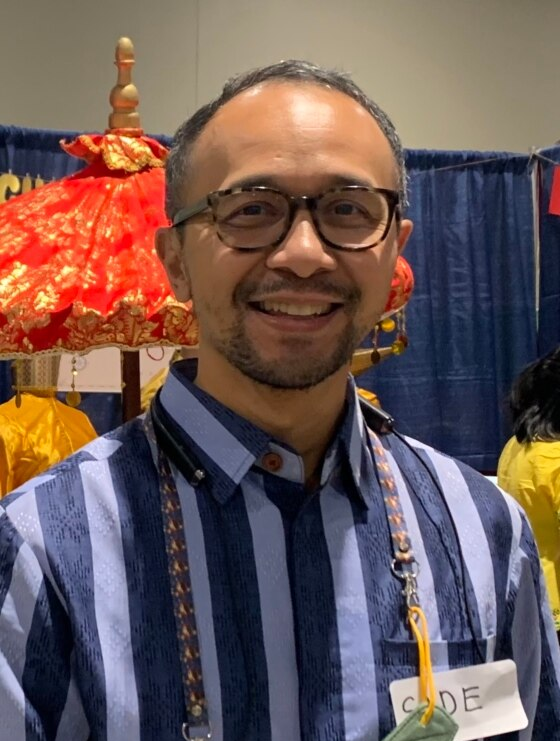

Indonesia Chargé d'Affaires ad interim to the U.S.
- In office 16 November 2023 – 2 September 2025
- President: Joko Widodo; Prabowo Subianto
- Preceded by: Rosan Roeslani (ambassador)
- Succeeded by: Nidya Kartikasari; Indroyono Soesilo (ambassador)

Personal details
- Born: May 26, 1973 (age 53)
- Spouse: Febriyanthi Suralaga
- Education: Victoria University of Wellington (B.A., M.Comms)

Ida Bagus Made "Sade" Bimantara (born 26 May 1973) is an Indonesian diplomat who is currently serving as director of ASEAN external cooperation. A career diplomat, Sade had served at diplomatic missions in Vienna, Canberra, and Washington. Most recently, he served as chargé d'affaires ad interim to the United States from 2023 to 2025.

== Early life and education ==
Sade was born on 26 May 1973. He earned a Bachelor of Arts in economics, money, and finance between 1994 and 1997 from the Victoria University of Wellington. He later returned to the same institution to pursue a Master of Communications within the Faculty of Commerce and Administration, completing the degree in 2002. During his time in Wellington, he also served as a research assistant for the chair of Malay studies from 1999 to 2002, where he assisted in research regarding Southeast Asia and the Pacific.

== Diplomatic career ==
Sade began his career in diplomatic service in December 2002. He briefly served at Indonesia's permanent mission in Vienna before returning to Indonesia as chief of section for the APEC subdirectorate from 2003 to 2006. He was subsequently posted to the economic section at the embassy in Washington, D.C., from 2006 to 2010. He started off his posting with the rank of attaché before being promoted to third secretary in 2008.

Upon returning to Jakarta, he briefly served as an officer for political, social, and security affairs at the foreign minister's office before joining the cabinet secretariat. Within the Secretariat, he worked as the deputy assistant special staff for international affairs of the president and later as the assistant special staff for international affairs of the president until October 2014, advising on global developments and bilateral strategies with major powers such as the U.S., China, and Australia. He served under special staff Teuku Faizasyah.

Sade continued his diplomatic trajectory with his assignment to the embassy in Canberra with the rank of first secretary, before being promoted counsellor. Being designated as the embassy's spokesperson, Sade served from 2014 to 2018. During this tenure, he spearheaded the Indonesia-Pacific strategy and helped elevate relations with Australia to a comprehensive strategic partnership. Sade also defended Indonesia's presence in Papua, stating that Papuans are already "free and with lives protected". He also warned the Melanesian Spearhead Group not to accept United Liberation Movement for West Papua as an observer, emphasizing the organization as "disruptive" and "destructive".

From Australia, Sade returned to Indonesia with his appointment as the deputy chief of staff to foreign minister Retno Marsudi from 2018 to 2020 before being named as the director of Europe I on 3 January 2020. His scope of responsibility includes West and Southern European countries. In the latter role, he organized business forums to increase trade with Central and East European countries, and was instrumental in coordinating the delivery of millions of COVID-19 vaccines for Indonesia. He continued to defend Indonesia's interest in Singapore by representing government in Papua-related webinars and discussion. He stated that "Papua was “much more open” than credited in social media" and that racism against Papuans in Indonesia is an "isolated pattern".

In February 2022, Sade was named as the deputy chief of mission in Washington, D.C., serving under ambassador Rosan Roeslani. Rosan was installed as the deputy minister for state-owned enterprises in July 2023 and handed over his duties to Sade on 16 November 2023. Sade was officially recognized as the embassy's chargé d'affaires ad interim by the U.S. Department of State exactly two weeks later on 30 November. Former deputy foreign minister commended Sade's provisional leadership of the embassy as "very good" and "competent", but noted that his longevity as chargé d'affaires ad interim meant that the embassy could not function optimally. Sade handed over his duties to the new deputy chief of mission, Nidya Kartikasari, on 2 September 2025, before assuming duties as the director for ASEAN external cooperation a week later on 9 September.
