= Sadda, Punjab =

Pakistani town

Sadda
- Town
- Location within Pakistan
- Coordinates: 32°29′33″N 74°31′52″E
- Country: Pakistan
- Province: Punjab
- District: Sialkot

Area
  - Total: 12 km^{2} (4.6 sq mi)

Population (2014)
  - Total: 2,252
  - Estimate (2015): 2,500
- Time zone: UTC+5 (PST)
- Calling code: 052

Sadda is a town in Sialkot District in the Punjab province of Pakistan. Part of Marakiwal Union Council of Sialkot, it is located at 32°34'60N 74°32'60E, at an altitude of 252 metres (830 feet). Connected by both Saidpur Road and Gondal Road, it is approximately 5 km from Sialkot City.
