= Ellinair =

Greek airline

IATA	ICAO	Call sign
EL	ELB	ELLINAIR HELLAS
- Founded: February 2013
- Commenced operations: February 2014
- Ceased operations: 2021
- Hubs: Thessaloniki International Airport; Athens International Airport
- Focus cities: Corfu International Airport; Heraklion International Airport
- Fleet size: 1
- Destinations: 20
- Parent company: Mouzenidis Group
- Headquarters: Thessaloniki, Central Macedonia, Greece
- Key people: I. Mouzenidis
- Website: en.ellinair.com

Ellinair was a Greek airline headquartered in Thessaloniki operating scheduled and charter flights.

== History ==
The new airline was established on 19 February 2013 and its first flight was operated in February 2014. The name Ellinair is a combination of the words "Έλλην" (Ellin - "Greek") and "air".

The company was a member of Mouzenidis Group, and it was created to serve the high volume of tourists, mainly from Russia, who visit Greece by Mouzenidis Travel. In October 2014, Ellinair flights were incorporated in all the Global Distribution Systems (GDSs) to ensure accessibility to all tourist agencies. On 15 June 2015, Ellinair launched new domestic routes from Athens and Thessaloniki.

Mouzenidis Travel ceased trading in 2021. EllinAir parked its aircraft fleet, intending to restart in 2022. In November 2021, Ellinair put plans to restart on hold, returning its aircraft to their lessors.

== Destinations ==
As of 2020 Ellinair operated scheduled flights to 32 destinations. Ellinair mainly operated flights to Eastern Europe and Russia from its main base at Thessaloniki International Airport and from Athens International Airport with additional direct flights to international destinations from Corfu International Airport and Heraklion International Airport during the summer leisure season.

=== Codeshare agreements ===
Ellinair codeshares with the following airline:

- Aeroflot

=== Charter flights ===
During the summer season, Ellinair operated several A320s, performing charter services in association with major tour operators. The charter flights connect popular holiday destinations in Greece to Italy, Poland, Israel, Russia, Austria, Germany, Ukraine and other countries.

== Fleet ==
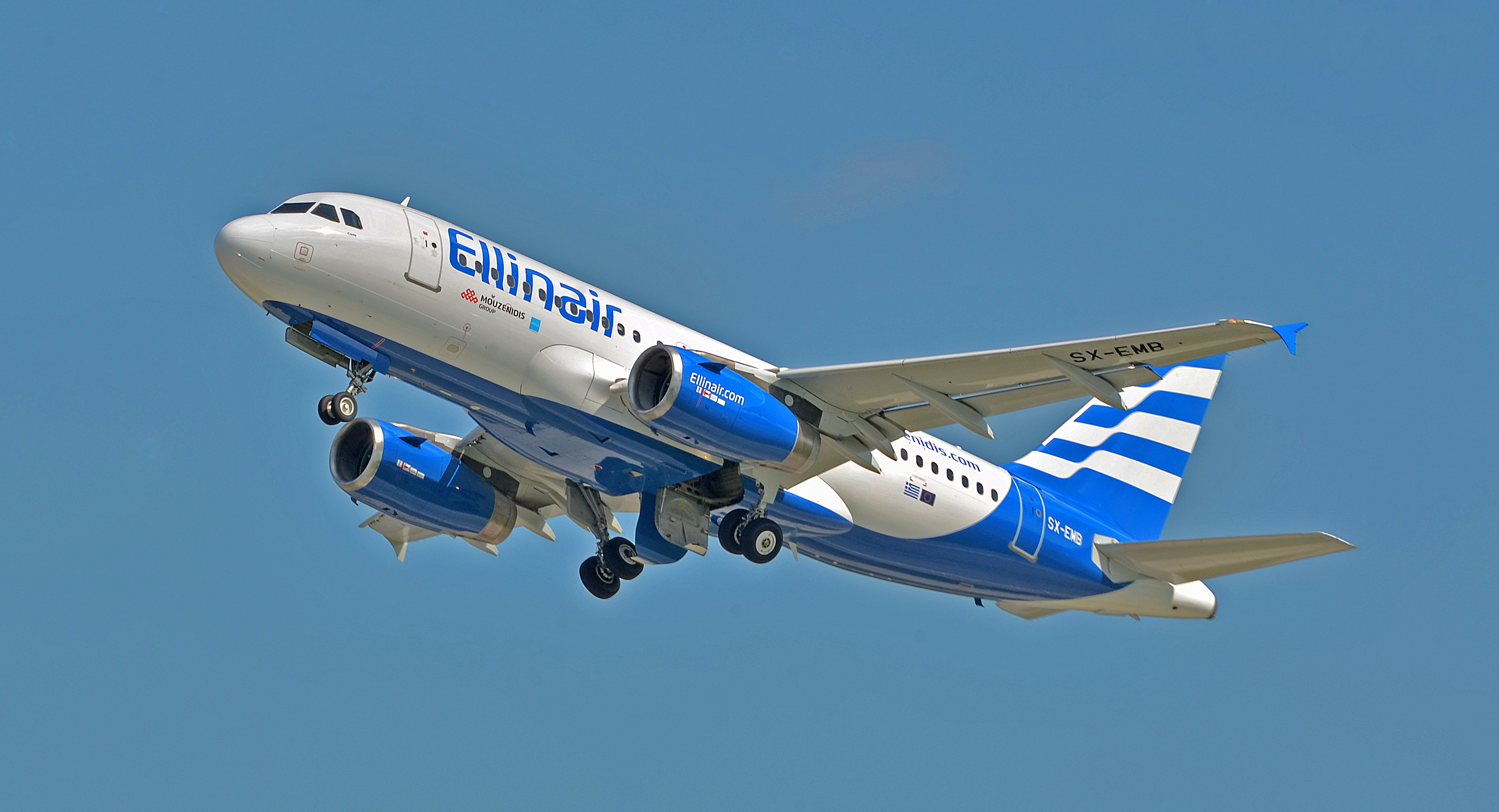
One of Ellinair's Airbus A319-100s

As of February 2022, the Ellinair fleet consisted of the following aircraft:

Ellinair fleet
Aircraft	In service	Orders	Passengers	Notes
Airbus A320-200	1	0	180Y	
Total	1	0		

=== Historical fleet ===
Other than the current aircraft, Ellinair also operated the following types:

- British Aerospace 146 x 2
- Boeing 737-300 x 3
- Boeing 737-400 x 2
- Airbus A319 x 2
- Airbus A320 x 4
