= Electroluminescent display =

Illuminated flat panel display

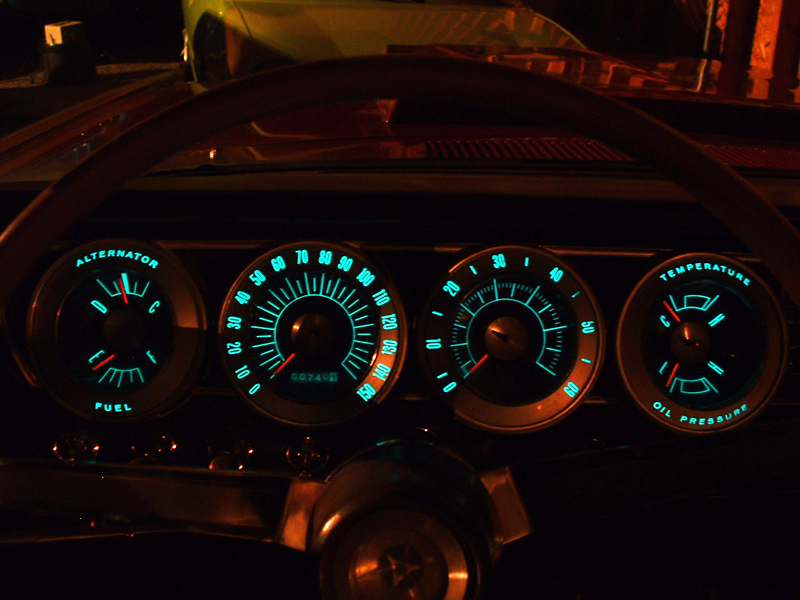
1966 Dodge Charger Electroluminescent Instrument Cluster

An electroluminescent display (ELD) is a type of flat panel display in which a layer of electroluminescent material, such as gallium arsenide, is placed between conductive layers. When electrically excited, the material emits visible light. Electroluminescence (EL) is the optical and electrical phenomenon in which a material emits light in response to an electric current or a strong electric field. The term "electroluminescent display" is generally used here for displays based on electroluminescent materials rather than discrete LED or OLED devices. Thin film electroluminescent (TFEL) displays have a structure broadly comparable to that of passive matrix LCD and OLED displays. Transparent electroluminescent displays, marketed by Beneq as TASEL displays, use transparent electrodes.

The structure of a TFEL is similar to that of a passive matrix LCD or OLED display, and TAESL displays are essentially transparent TEFL displays with transparent electrodes. TAESL displays can have a transparency of 80%. Both TEFL and TAESL displays use chip-on-glass technology, which mounts the display driver IC directly on one of the edges of the display. TAESL displays can be embedded onto glass sheets. Unlike LCDs, TFELs are much more rugged and can operate at temperatures from −60 to 105 °C and unlike OLEDs, TFELs can operate for 100,000 hours without considerable burn-in, retaining about 85% of their initial brightness. The electroluminescent material is deposited using atomic layer deposition, which is a process that deposits one 1-atom thick layer at a time.

== Mechanism ==
EL works by electrically exciting atoms in a material, causing them to emit photons. The colour of the emitted light depends on the material used. An ELD can be constructed from parallel opaque electrode strips covered by a layer of electroluminescent material, with a second set of electrodes arranged perpendicular to the first. The upper electrodes are transparent so that the emitted light can pass through.

The intersections of the two sets of electrodes form individually addressable display elements, or pixels.

== Uses ==
Electroluminescent displays have primarily been used in specialised applications. The display and keyboard unit of the Apollo Guidance Computer used segmented electroluminescent numerical displays. EL displays were also used to indicate speed and altitude in the cockpit of Concorde, and as floor indicators in some Otis elevators from about 1989 to 2007.

EL displays can also operate across a wider temperature range than many conventional display technologies.

== Abbreviations ==
Common abbreviations associated with electroluminescent display technology include:

- AMEL – active-matrix electroluminescence
- TFEL – thin-film electroluminescence
- TDEL – thick dielectric electroluminescence

== See also ==
- Electroluminescence
- History of display technology
- Thick-film dielectric electroluminescent technology
