= Mercedes Pinto =

Spanish writer

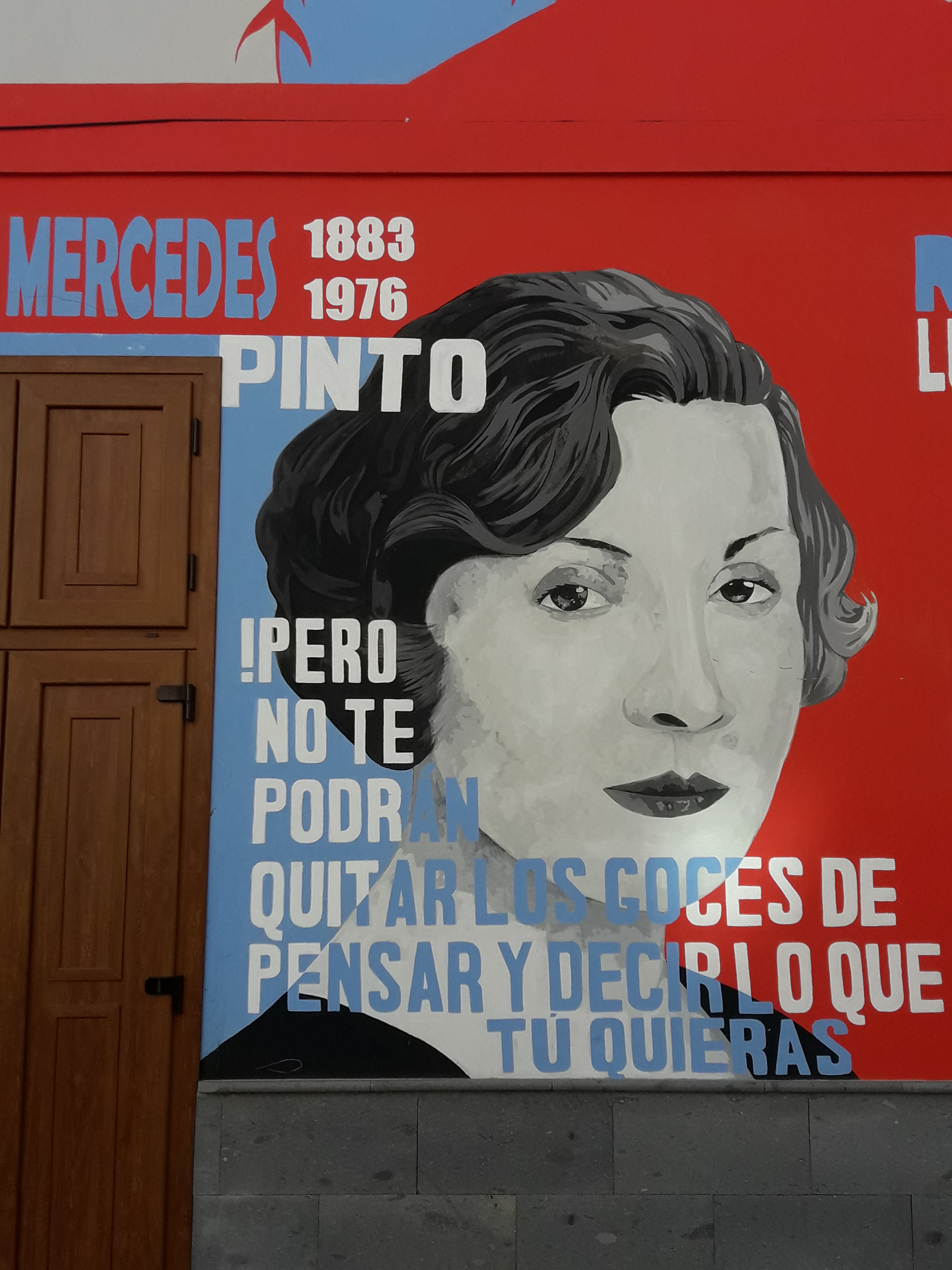
- Born: Mercedes Pinto Armas; 12 October 1883; La Laguna (Tenerife), Spain
- Died: 21 October 1976 (aged 93); Mexico City, Mexico

Mercedes Pinto Armas (12 October 1883 in La Laguna, Tenerife – 21 October 1976 in Ciudad de México) was a Spanish writer. Her 1926 novel He is the basis of the Luis Buñuel film Él (This Strange Passion, 1953).

== Works ==
- Plays : "Un señor cualquiera" (1930), "Silencio" (1929), "Una mujer, Ana Rosa" (1932).
- Poems : "Brisas del Teide" (1921), "Cantos de muchos puertos" (1940), "Más alto que el águila" (1968).
- Essay : "La emoción de Montevideo" (1949).
- Novels : "Él" (1926), "Ella" (1934), "El alma grande del pequeño Juan" (1950).
- Film : "El coleccionista de cadáveres" (1966), "Días de viejo color" (1967).
