= Sadeh (disambiguation) =

Sadeh is an Iranian winter festival.

Sadeh may also refer to:

== People ==
- Sadeh (queen) (floruit 21st century BCE), ancient Egyptian queen consort
- Pinchas Sadeh (born Pinchas Feldman, 1929-94), Polish-born Israeli novelist and poet
- Yitzhak Sadeh (born Isaac Landsberg, 1890-1952), commander of the Palmach, a founder of the Israel Defense Forces

== Places ==
- Mashabei Sadeh, a kibbutz in the Negev desert in Israel
- Pe'at Sadeh, was an Israeli settlement
- Sadeh, Darab, Fars Province, Iran
- Sadeh, Mazandaran, Iran

== Awards ==
- The Yitzhak Sadeh Prize for Military Literature, an annual literary award given in Israel

== Mythical beings ==
- Adne Sadeh, a legendary beast from Jewish folklore

== See also ==
- Sada (disambiguation)
- Sadda (disambiguation)
