= Electroluminescence =

Optical and electrical phenomenon

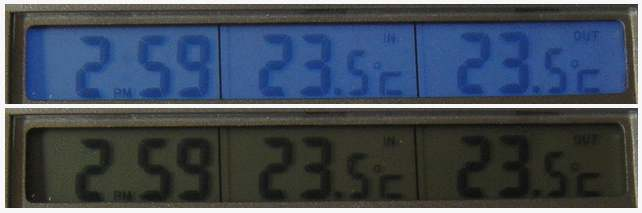
Views of a liquid crystal display, both with electroluminescent backlight switched on (top) and switched off (bottom)

Electroluminescence (EL) is an optical and electrical phenomenon in which a material emits light in response to the passage of an electric current or to a strong electric field. This is distinct from black body light emission resulting from heat (incandescence), illumination by light (photoluminescence), chemical reactions (chemiluminescence), reactions in a liquid (electrochemiluminescence), sound (sonoluminescence), or other mechanical action (mechanoluminescence), or organic electroluminescence.

== Mechanism ==
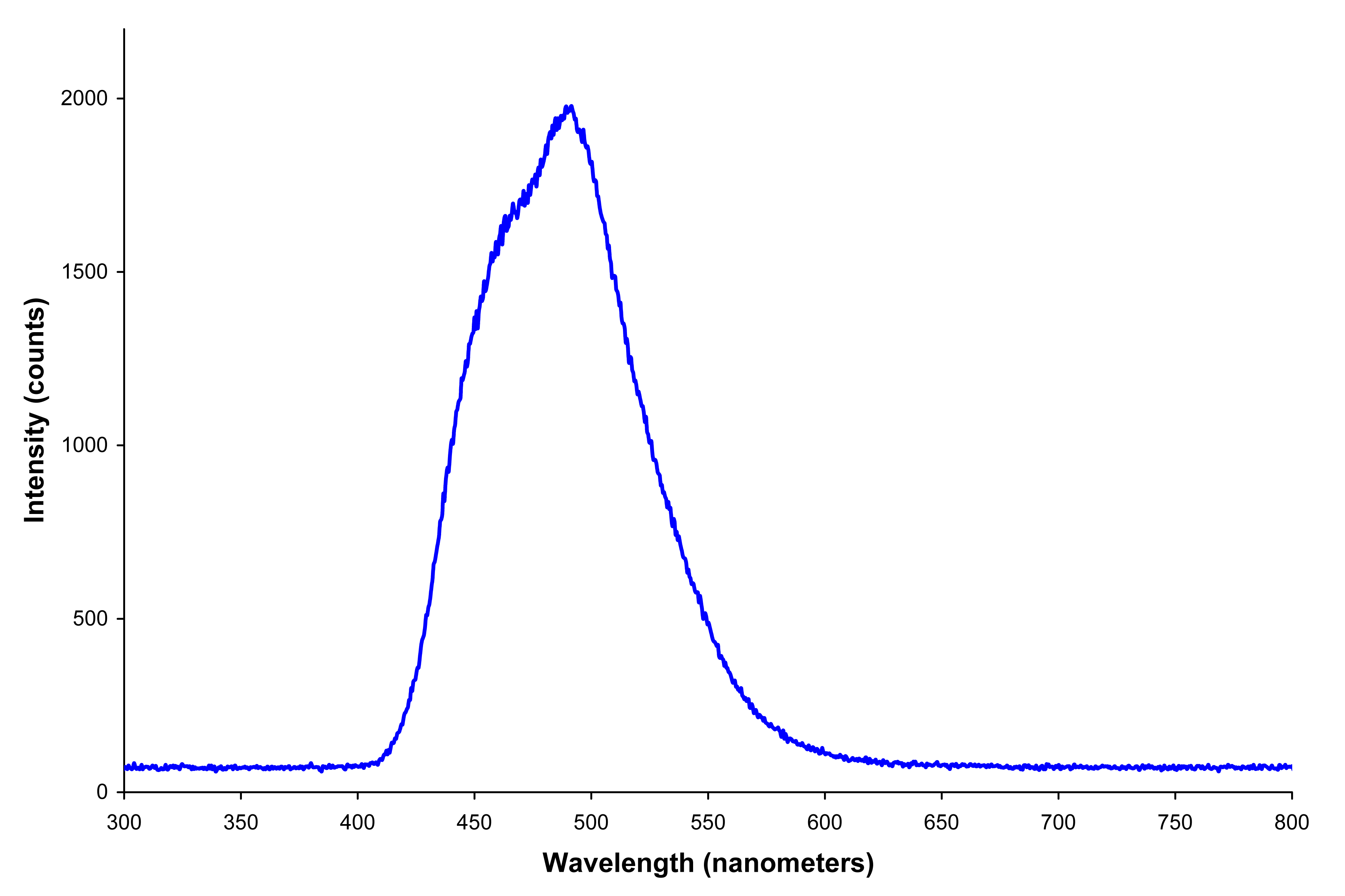
Spectrum of a blue/green electroluminescent light source for a clock radio (similar to the one seen in the above image). Peak wavelength is at 492 nm and the FWHM spectral bandwidth is quite wide at about 85 nm.

Electroluminescence is the result of radiative recombination of electrons and holes in a material, usually a semiconductor. The excited electrons release their energy as photons – light. Prior to recombination, electrons and holes may be separated either by doping the material to form a p-n junction (in semiconductor electroluminescent devices such as light-emitting diodes) or through excitation by impact of high-energy electrons accelerated by a strong electric field (as with the phosphors in electroluminescent displays).

It has been recently shown that as a thin-film CdTe solar cell improves its light-to-electricity efficiency (improved open-circuit voltage), it will also improve its electricity-to-light (EL) efficiency.

== Characteristics ==
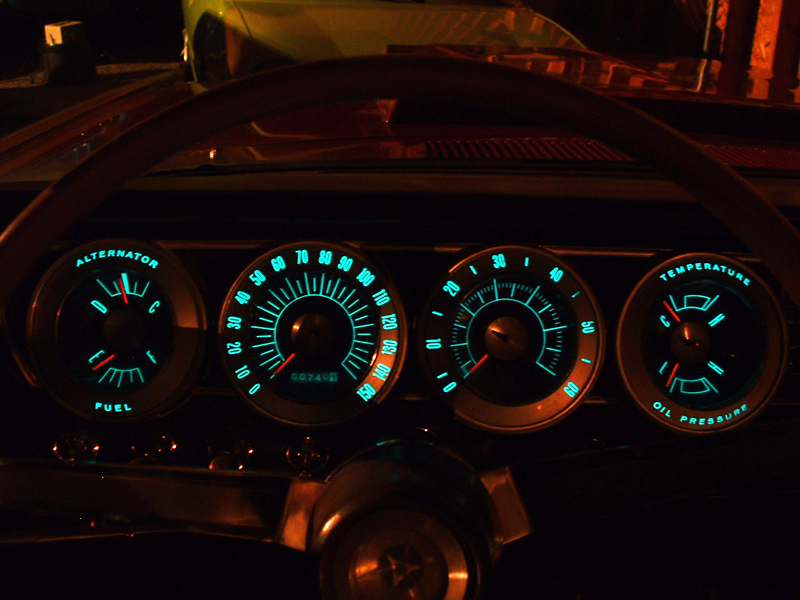
1966 Dodge Charger instrument panel with "Panelescent Lighting". Chrysler first introduced cars with EL panel lighting in its 1960 model year.

Electroluminescent technologies have rather low power consumption compared to competing lighting technologies, such as neon or fluorescent lamps. This, together with the thinness of the material, has made EL technology valuable to the advertising industry. Relevant advertising applications include electroluminescent billboards and signs. EL manufacturers can control precisely which areas of an electroluminescent sheet illuminate, and when. This has given advertisers the ability to create more dynamic advertising that is still compatible with traditional advertising spaces.

An EL film is a so-called Lambertian radiator: unlike with neon lamps, filament lamps, or LEDs, the brightness of the surface appears the same from all angles of view; electroluminescent light is not directional. The light emitted from the surface is perfectly homogeneous and is well-perceived by the eye. EL film produces single-frequency (monochromatic) light that has a very narrow bandwidth, is uniform and visible from a great distance.

In principle, EL lamps can be made in any color. However, the commonly used greenish color closely matches the peak sensitivity of human vision, producing the greatest apparent light output for the least electrical power input. Unlike neon and fluorescent lamps, EL lamps are not negative resistance devices so no extra circuitry is needed to regulate the amount of current flowing through them. A new technology now being used is based on multispectral phosphors that emit light from 600 to 400 nm depending on the drive frequency; this is similar to the color-changing effect seen with aqua EL sheet but on a larger scale.

== Examples of electroluminescent materials ==
Electroluminescent devices are fabricated using either organic or inorganic electroluminescent materials. The active materials are generally semiconductors with a sufficiently wide enough band gap to allow the exit of the light.

The most typical inorganic thin-film EL (TFEL) is ZnS:Mn with yellow-orange emission. Examples of the range of EL material include:

- Powdered zinc sulfide doped with copper (producing greenish light) or silver (producing bright blue light)
- Thin-film zinc sulfide doped with manganese (producing orange-red color)
- Naturally blue diamond, which includes a trace of boron that acts as a dopant.
- Semiconductors containing Group III and Group V elements, such as indium phosphide (InP), gallium arsenide (GaAs), and gallium nitride (GaN) (Light-emitting diodes).
- Certain organic semiconductors, such as [Ru(bpy)_{3}]^{2+}(PF_{6}^{−})_{2}, where bpy is 2,2'-bipyridine
- Terbium oxide (yellow-green light)

== Practical implementations ==
The most common electroluminescent (EL) devices are composed of either powder (primarily used in lighting applications) or thin films (for information displays.)

=== Light-emitting capacitor (LEC) ===
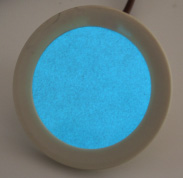
An electroluminescent nightlight in operation (uses 0.08 W at 230 V, and dates from 1960; lit diameter is 59 mm)

Light-emitting capacitor, or LEC, is a term used since at least 1961 to describe electroluminescent panels. General Electric has patents dating to 1938 on flat electroluminescent panels that are still made as night lights and backlights for instrument panel displays. Electroluminescent panels are a capacitor where the dielectric between the outside plates is a phosphor that gives off photons when the capacitor is charged. By making one of the contacts transparent, the large area exposed emits light.

Electroluminescent automotive instrument panel backlighting, with each gauge pointer also an individual light source, entered production on 1960 Chrysler and Imperial passenger cars, and was continued successfully on several Chrysler vehicles through 1967 and marketed as "Panelescent Lighting".

=== Night lights ===
The Sylvania Lighting Division in Salem and Danvers, Massachusetts, produced and marketed an EL night light, under the trade name Panelescent at roughly the same time that the Chrysler instrument panels entered production. These lamps have proven extremely reliable, with some samples known to be still functional after nearly 50 years of continuous operation.

Later in the 1960s, Sylvania's Electronic Systems Division in Needham, Massachusetts developed and manufactured several instruments for the Apollo Lunar Module and Command Module using electroluminescent display panels manufactured by the Electronic Tube Division of Sylvania at Emporium, Pennsylvania. Raytheon in Sudbury, Massachusetts manufactured the Apollo Guidance Computer, which used a Sylvania electroluminescent display panel as part of its display-keyboard interface (DSKY).

=== Display backlighting ===
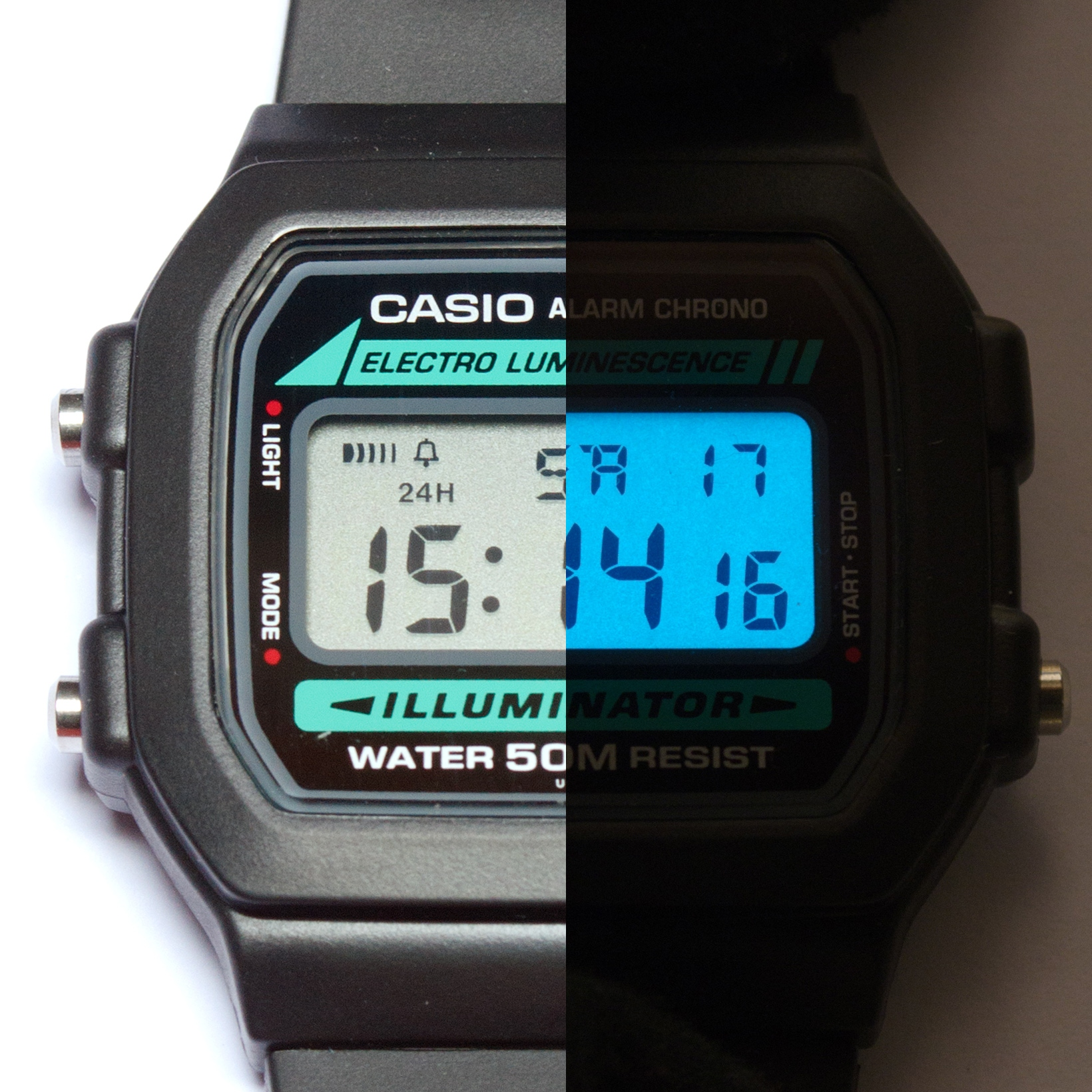
A Casio digital LCD watch with an electroluminescent backlight

Powder phosphor-based electroluminescent panels are frequently used as backlights for liquid crystal displays. They readily provide gentle, even illumination for the entire display while consuming relatively little electric power. This makes them convenient for battery-operated devices such as pagers, wristwatches, and computer-controlled thermostats, and their gentle green-cyan glow is common in the technological world.

EL backlights require relatively high voltage (between 60 and 600 volts). For battery-operated devices, this voltage must be generated by a boost converter circuit within the device. This converter often makes a faintly audible whine or siren sound while the backlight is activated. Line-voltage-operated devices may be activated directly from the power line; some electroluminescent nightlights operate in this fashion. Brightness per unit area increases with increased voltage and frequency.

Thin-film phosphor electroluminescence was first commercialized during the 1980s by Sharp Corporation in Japan, Finlux (Oy Lohja Ab) in Finland, and Planar Systems in the US. In these devices, bright, long-life light emission is achieved in thin-film yellow-emitting manganese-doped zinc sulfide material. Displays using this technology were manufactured for medical and vehicle applications where ruggedness and wide viewing angles were crucial, and liquid crystal displays were not well developed. In 1992, Timex introduced its Indiglo EL display on some watches.

Recently, blue-, red-, and green-emitting thin film electroluminescent materials that offer the potential for long life and full-color electroluminescent displays have been developed.

The EL material must be enclosed between two electrodes and at least one electrode must be transparent to allow the escape of the produced light. Glass coated with indium tin oxide is commonly used as the front (transparent) electrode, while the back electrode is coated with reflective metal. Additionally, other transparent conducting materials, such as carbon nanotube coatings or PEDOT can be used as the front electrode.

The display applications are primarily passive (i.e., voltages are driven from the edge of the display cf. driven from a transistor on the display). Similar to LCD trends, there have also been Active Matrix EL (AMEL) displays demonstrated, where the circuitry is added to prolong voltages at each pixel. The solid-state nature of TFEL allows for a very rugged and high-resolution display fabricated even on silicon substrates. AMEL displays of 1280×1024 at over 1000 lines per inch (LPI) have been demonstrated by a consortium including Planar Systems.

== Thick-film dielectric electroluminescent technology ==
Thick-film dielectric electroluminescent technology (TDEL) is a phosphor-based flat panel display technology developed by Canadian company iFire Technology Corp. TDEL is based on inorganic electroluminescent (IEL) technology that combines both thick-and thin-film processes. The TDEL structure is made with glass or other substrates, consisting of a thick-film dielectric layer and a thin-film phosphor layer sandwiched between two sets of electrodes to create a matrix of pixels. Inorganic phosphors within this matrix emit light in the presence of an alternating electric field.

=== Color By Blue ===
Color By Blue (CBB) was developed in 2003. The Color By Blue process achieves higher luminance and better performance than the previous triple pattern process, with increased contrast, grayscale rendition, and color uniformity across the panel. Color By Blue is based on the physics of photoluminescence. High luminance inorganic blue phosphor is used in combination with specialized color conversion materials, which absorb the blue light and re-emit red or green light, to generate the other colors.

== New applications ==
Electroluminescent lighting is now used as an application for public safety identification involving alphanumeric characters on the roof of vehicles for clear visibility from an aerial perspective.

Electroluminescent lighting, especially electroluminescent wire (EL wire), has also made its way into clothing as many designers have brought this technology to the entertainment and nightlife industry. From 2006, t-shirts with an electroluminescent panel stylized as an audio equalizer, the T-Qualizer, saw a brief period of popularity.

Engineers have developed an electroluminescent "skin" that can stretch more than six times its original size while still emitting light. This hyper-elastic light-emitting capacitor (HLEC) can endure more than twice the strain of previously tested stretchable displays. It consists of layers of transparent hydrogel electrodes sandwiching an insulating elastomer sheet. The elastomer changes luminance and capacitance when stretched, rolled, and otherwise deformed. In addition to its ability to emit light under a strain of greater than 480% of its original size, the group's HLEC was shown to be capable of being integrated into a soft robotic system. Three six-layer HLEC panels were bound together to form a crawling soft robot, with the top four layers making up the light-up skin and the bottom two the pneumatic actuators. The discovery could lead to significant advances in health care, transportation, electronic communication and other areas.

== See also ==
- Galvanoluminescence – Light produced by passing electric current through an appropriate electrolyte
- List of light sources – Devices and processes that produce light
- OLED – Diode that emits light from an organic compound
- Photoelectric effect – Emission of electrons when electromagnetic radiation hits a material
