= Elle (given name) =

Female given name

Elle is a female given name. Notable people and characters with the name include:

== People ==
- Elle Anderson (born 1988), American cyclist
- Elle Armit (born 1991), Australian water polo player
- Elle Bennetts (born 1989), Australian rules footballer
- Elle van den Bogaart (born 1959), Dutch children's writer
- Elle Cochran, American politician
- Elle Cordova (born 1988), American singer-songwriter and lead of the folk/rock band Reina del Cid
- Elle Dawe (born 1981), Australian actress, comedian and model
- Elle Duncan (born 1983), American sports anchor
- Elle Evans (born 1989), American model and actress
- Elle Fanning (born 1998), American actress
- Elle Festin, American tattoo artist
- Elle Fowler (born 1988), American YouTuber
- Elle Graham (born 2009), American television and film actress
- Elle Hartje (born 2001), American ice hockey player
- Elle Johnson (born 1990), American television writer, producer, and showrunner
- Elle Klarskov Jørgensen (born 1958), Danish sculptor
- Elle Kaplan, American entrepreneur
- Elle Kennedy, Canadian romantic fiction writer
- Elle King (born 1989), American singer, songwriter and actress
- Elle Kull (born 1952), Estonian actress and politician
- Elle LaMont (born 1981), American actress
- Elle Leonard (born 1992), American entrepreneur, philanthropist and athlete
- Elle Limebear (born 1997), British worship singer, songwriter and artist
- Elle Logan (born 1987), American rower
- Elle Macpherson (born 1964), Australian supermodel and actress
- Elle McLemore (born 1991), American actress
- Elle McNicoll (born 1992), Scottish children's writer
- Elle Mehrmand, American new media performance artist
- Elle Mills (born 1998), Canadian YouTube vlogger
- Elle Morgan (born 2000), American DJ
- Elle Moxley (born 1986/1987), American transgender rights activist
- Elle Mulvaney (born 2002), English child actress
- Elle Nash, American editor and author
- Elle Pérez, American photographer
- Elle Purrier St. Pierre (born 1995), American runner
- Elle Ramirez, Filipina actress, singer, dancer and model
- Elle Reeve (born 1982), American journalist and correspondent
- Elle Royal (born 1990), American rapper
- Elle Schneider (born 1985), American filmmaker and camera developer
- Elle Simone, American chef, culinary producer, test cook and food stylist
- Elle Smith (born 1998), American model, journalist, and Miss USA 2021 winner
- Elle-Máijá Tailfeathers (born 1986), Blackfoot and Sámi filmmaker, actor, and producer
- Elle Varner (born 1989), American singer
- Elle Villanueva (born 1996), Filipino actress and dancer
- Elle Walker, American vlogger
- Elle Winter (born 1999), American singer, songwriter and actress

== Fictional characters ==
- Elle, from the 2018 film adaptation of The Little Mermaid
- Elle Argent, from the Netflix TV series Heartstopper
- Elle Bishop, from the U.S. TV series Heroes
- Elle Driver, from the film Kill Bill
- Elle Evans, from the film The Kissing Booth
- Elle Greenaway, from the TV series Criminal Minds
- Elle McFeast, Australian television character created by comedian Libbi Gorr
- Elle Robinson, from the Australian soap opera Neighbours
- Elle the Thumbelina Fairy, from the British book series Rainbow Magic
- Elle Tomkins, from the TV series The Society
- Elle Woods, from the film Legally Blonde and sequels and adaptations
- Elle, from the video game Puyo Puyo Tetris

== See also ==
- Elle (disambiguation)
