= Ell (disambiguation) =

An ell is a measure of length.

Ell or ELL may also refer to:

== People ==
- Ell (surname), a family name
- Eldar Gasimov (born 1989), Azerbaijani singer
- Ell Roberson (born 1980), American football player

== Places ==
- Ell, Luxembourg, a commune and town
- Ell, Netherlands, a town
- Ell Pond (disambiguation)

== Other uses ==
- Ell (architecture), a wing of a building perpendicular to the length of the main portion
- ELL (gene), coding for the RNA polymerase II elongation factor ELL
- East London line, part of the London Overground
- Encyclopedia of Language and Linguistics, a compendium of human communication
- English-language learner
- European Lunar Lander
- Edges of the Last Layer, in speedcubing
- L, a letter
  - The character ℓ ("script small L"), encoded in TeX as \ell
  - The azimuthal quantum number, represented by ℓ
- Modern Greek language

== See also ==
- Aelle (disambiguation)
- Elle (disambiguation)
- Ells (disambiguation)
