= Aella =

Aella, is a Greek feminine given name and may refer to:

- Aella (Amazon) (Ancient Greek: Ἄελλα), an Amazon in Greek mythology.
- Aella (writer), or Aella_girl, an American sex researcher and sex worker

== See also ==
- Aela (disambiguation)
- Aelle, an English masculine Given name
- Aello, one of the harpies
