= Ells =

Ells may refer to:

- Ell, a measure of length
- Ell (architecture)
- Ells (surname), a surname
- Ells, Iowa
- Ells Field, an airport in Mendocino County, California, United States
- Ells River, in Alberta, Canada
- Euroleague for Life Sciences

== See also ==
- Ell (disambiguation)
