= Old Kiron, Iowa =

- Ghost town
- Location within Iowa
- Coordinates: 42°11′48″N 95°18′14″W
- Country: United States
- State: Iowa
- County: Crawford County
- Time zone: UTC-6 (Central (CST))
  - Summer (DST): UTC-5 (CDT)

Old Kiron was an unincorporated community in Crawford County, in the U.S. state of Iowa. Today, it is the site of a few scattered farms in what is essentially a ghost town.

== History ==
=== Early years ===
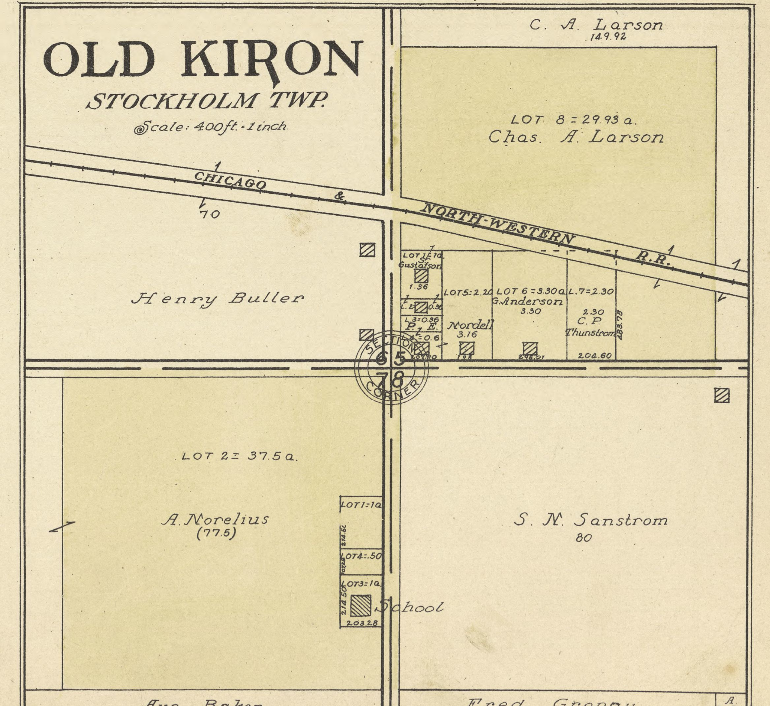
Plat map of Old Kiron, Iowa, in 1908

Originally named Kiron, the community was platted at the corners of sections 5, 6, 7, and 8 in Stockholm Township. The community was founded by Swedish immigrants. A post office opened in Kiron in 1872. Andrew Norelius served as the Kiron postmaster for 18 years.

Proposals for the name of the community included Swedeboy and Swedeberg, but there were already towns in Iowa with similar names. Lars Olson and A. Norelius settled on Kiron, named after a place in Mongolia.

The Swede Brothers opened a store in Kiron circa 1882; this store became the Lester & Cole store in 1890, and became the G.A. Norelius general store in 1892. At that time, all goods were hauled in from Odebolt, Iowa, with each trip taking one day on primitive, ungraded roads.

=== Decline ===
When a new rail line on the Chicago and North Western Railroad opened one mile to the west, the present-day settlement of Kiron, Iowa was created, platted in 1899. Both communities existed side by side in 1908 when the Standard Atlas of Crawford County, Iowa was published, but the plat map of Old Kiron showed only ten plots of land in the community.

To differentiate the two communities, residents began calling the original community Stockholm and the new community New Kiron: "New Kiron sends Merry Christmas greeting to her sister towns in Crawford county and tells the REVIEW to wish them as Happy and as Prosperous a New Year as she herself expects to have. The same Spirit of thrift and industry which made old Kiron a thriving business center when it was miles from a railroad has contributed its full share to the uplifting of the new town [...] Kiron is finely situated on the Mondamin branch of the Chicago & North-Western Railway and is the first station west of Boyer. It is located in Otter Creek township - a township which raises more hogs than any other township in Iowa and consequently in the world. A mile east lies Stockholm, long noted as the prosperous home of our Scandinavian settlement, and it is this settlement which has been transplanted to make New Kiron. Already the old town is dismantled, a number of homes remain in the old location but the busy stores have been moved and are busier than ever."

Many businesses moved to New Kiron, leaving Old Kiron mostly empty. A post office in Stockholm operated until 1915. However, many publications referred to the community as Old Kiron, and this is the name it is referred to as, in county atlases and histories. The old Kiron school was still open in 1906.

Crawford County officials call Old Kiron a "forgotten town".

The population of Old Kiron (then called Kiron) in 1890 was 25.

== See also ==
- Boyer, Iowa
- Ells, Iowa
