= Ell Pond =

Ell Pond may refer to:

- Ell Pond (Massachusetts)
- Ell Pond (Rhode Island)
