= Mark of the Four Waves =

Tatak Ng Apat Na Alon Tribe or Mark of the Four Waves tribe in English, is a transnational collective made up of members of the Filipino diaspora who work to preserve the ancestral traditions of Filipino tattooing. It was founded in 1996 in Los Angeles by tattoo artist Elle Festin.

== History ==
Elle Festin was born and raised in the Philippines. His parents immigrated to the United States when he was a teenager. In 1996 during a stay in Hawaii, he met the Tahitian tattoo artist Po'oino, Dwayne Johnson's tattoo artist. This tattoo makes him aware of his indigenous identity. He then sets out in search of information on the traditional culture of the Philippines, and more particularly the various tattoo traditions. Elle Festin was quickly joined by many other people from the Filipino diaspora. He trained in tattooing first with electric machines, then moved on to traditional tattooing and began designing his own tools.

In 2008 the tribe has several hundred active members scattered across five continents, who occasionally meet up at international tattoo conventions. As part of the filming of the episode of Lars Krutak's series Tattoo Hunter dedicated to the Philippines, Elle Festin and her wife Zel travel to the Kalinga province to meet Whang-od, the last traditional tattoo artist. While She was apprehensive, the old woman held a grand ceremony and asked her to tattoo her. Elle Festin says in the film: “It was an incredibly inspiring experience and now, more than ever, I feel deep in my heart that I should continue this renewal for her and for the many others who are searching for their culture and their roots. I want to expose the great depth and beauty of tribal tattooing because the tribal pieces we make here at Spiritual Journey are not pieces of flash art that you see on the walls of other shops. Rather, we create a art that has an energy and life of its own and our customers are drawn to it because it contains many layers of meaning.”

In 2018 the tribe was the subject of a documentary film directed by Jonathan Bougard, while a delegation of around thirty members found all the masters of traditional indigenous tattooing on the island of Moorea in French Polynesia. For a whole week they exchange, dance and tattoo each other.

In 2021 Elle Festin is the subject of the third episode of the documentary series Skinindignous.

== Filmography ==
- Tattoo Hunter: Philippines. By Kim MacKarrie and Ciara Byrne. 44 mins. Half Yard Productions 2009
- Mark of the four waves tribe. By Jonathan Bougard. 26 mn. In Vivo Prod 2019
- Filipino tattoo Sampaguita Jay. By Jonathan Bougard. 8 mn. In Vivo Prod 2019
- Elle Festin. 26 mn. Written and directed by Sara Ben-Saud. 2021

== Bibliography ==
- Kalinga Tattoo Ancient & Modern Expressions of the Tribal, Lars Krutak, ED REUSS 2010
