= Ells, Iowa =

- Ghost town
- Location within Iowa
- Coordinates: 42°10′03″N 95°14′13″W
- Country: United States
- State: Iowa
- County: Crawford
- Elevation: 1,220 ft (372 m)
- Time zone: UTC-6 (Central (CST))
  - Summer (DST): UTC-5 (CDT)
- Area code: 712

Ells was an unincorporated community in Crawford County, in the U.S. state of Iowa. Today it is a ghost town.

== History ==
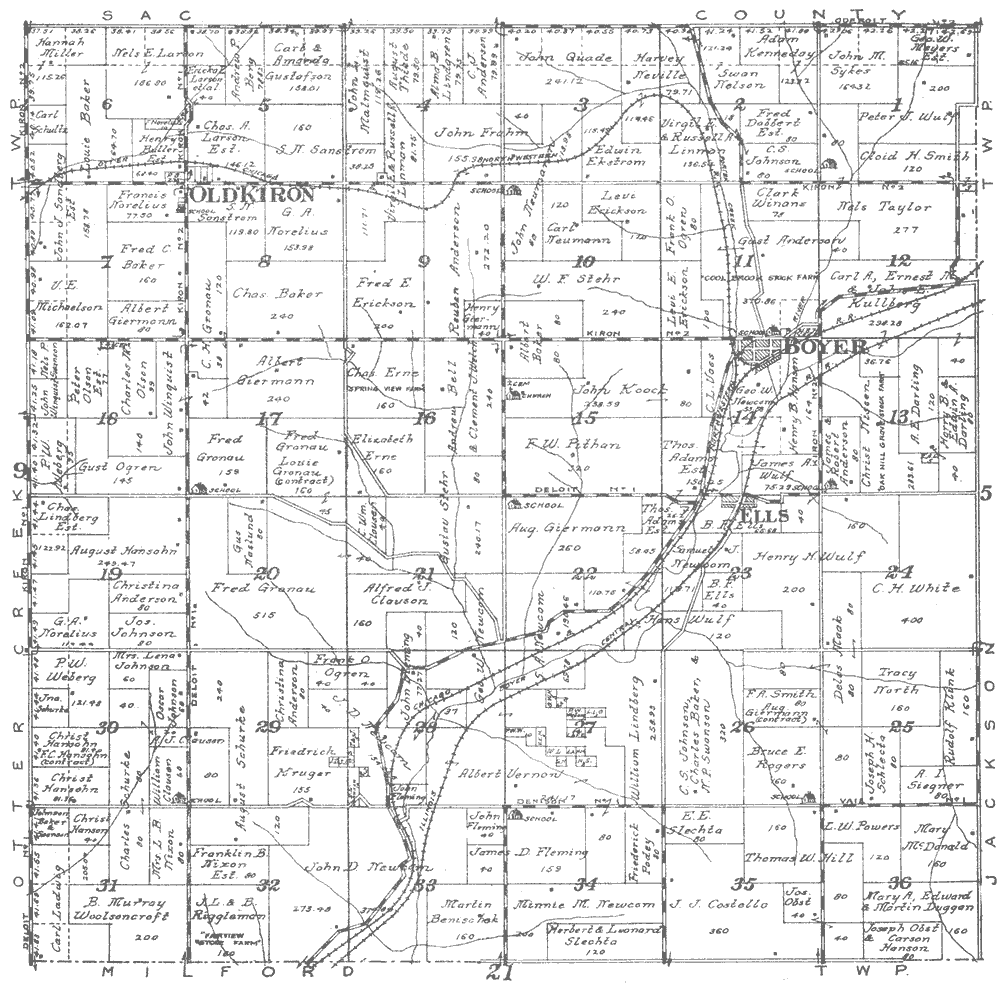
Stockholm Township, Iowa 1920, showing the location of Boyer, Old Kiron, and Ells.

Ells was a village in Stockholm Township, Crawford County, Iowa, platted in either 1899 or 1900. A post office was established in Ells on January 24, 1900 by Benjamin F. Ells. News of the new post office appeared in the Daily Iowa Capital in Des Moines on February 15, 1900.

Ells, located one mile south of Boyer, was on the Illinois Central Railroad and had a train depot and general store in 1911. Benjamin Ells served as the postmaster, appointed by President William McKinley.

The post office at Ells was discontinued April 15, 1914. In 1915, the population of Ells was 26. Today, Crawford County residents consider Ells a "lost" town.

== See also ==
Old Kiron, Iowa, another ghost town in Stockholm Township
