= Aela =

Aela may refer to:

== Places ==
- Aela (Arabia), the Ancient port city on the Red Sea and former bishopric in Palestina Tertia Salutaris, now Aqaba (Jordan)
- Aela (Estonia), an Estonian village in Harju County

== People ==
- Aela Callan
- Aella (Amazon) (Ancient Greek: Ἄελλα), an Amazon in Greek mythology

== See also ==
- Aella (disambiguation)
