= Elle =

Elle may refer to:

== Arts, entertainment and media ==
- Elle (magazine), a fashion publication
  - Elle Style Awards
- Elle (India), the Indian edition
- Elle (film), a 2016 French film
- Elle: A Modern Cinderella Tale, a 2010 American teen film
- "Elle", a song by Sophie from Product
- Elle (album), 2024, by Dagny
- Elle (TV series), a 2026 prequel to the 2001 film Legally Blonde

== Language ==
- Elle (letter), the 14th letter of the Spanish alphabet until 2010
- Elle (Spanish pronoun), a proposed Spanish gender-neutral pronoun
- Elle, one of the French personal pronouns

== People ==
- Elle (given name), a female given name
- Ferdinand Elle (1570–1637), French portrait painter

== Places ==
- Elle, Central African Republic, a village
- Elle (river), in Normandy, France
- Ellé, a river in Brittany, France

== Other uses ==
- Elle (sport), a Sri Lankan game similar to baseball
- Elle, an obsolete German unit of measurement

== See also ==
- Ælle of Sussex (fl. c. 477–c. 514), first king of the South Saxons
- Ell
- ELL (disambiguation)
- Aelle (disambiguation)
- Elles
