= Paul Krutak =

American paleontologist

Paul Russell Krutak (born 1934 in Pueblo, Colorado; died December 7, 2016) was an eminent American micropaleontologist. He received his Bachelor's and master's degrees in Geology at Louisiana State University (LSU) in Baton Rouge, as well as a Ph.D. in Geology at LSU in 1963. His dissertation was entitled Structure, Stratigraphy, and Provincial Relationships of Sierra de la Gavia, Coahuila, Mexico.

Krutak was a Professor of Geology at Eastern New Mexico University, Ball State University, and the University of Nebraska-Lincoln. During his tenure at the universities, Krutak was a prolific publisher of micropaleontology articles, mainly on ostracods, authoring more than 70 papers in peer-reviewed journals. He provided the first descriptions of several ostracod taxa: Cytheromorpha anceps (1971), Cytherura erugata (1971), Loxoconcha tricornata (1971), Loxoconcha tricornata (1971), Protocytheretta ambifaria (1971), Climacoidea (Proteoconcha) costa (1979), Hemicyprideis nichuptensis (1994), and Paranesidea cancunensis (1994). These works were largely based on fieldwork in Mexico, which began in the 1950s, as well as the coastal areas of Mississippi and Louisiana.

After leaving the University of Nebraska in 1982, Krutak worked as a consulting geologist for ARCO Oil Company, primarily in Lafayette, Louisiana, with some time spent on the North Slope in Alaska. Following his stint at ARCO, Krutak finished his formal teaching career as a Professor of Geology and Chairman of the Geology Department at Fort Hays State University. In 1997, he received the President's Distinguished Scholar Award.

A lifelong member of the American Association of Petroleum Geologists, the Gulf Coast Association of Geological Societies, and Fellow of the Geological Society of America, the ostracods (1971) Loxocorniculum tricornatum Krutak and (1976) Puriana krutaki were named after him.

Krutak was an outdoorsman at heart and enjoyed mountain climbing, scaling numerous 14,000-footers in Colorado, Mt. Rainier in Washington, as well as 17,000+ foot volcanic peaks in Mexico, including Pico de Orizaba, Popocatépetl, and Iztaccíhuatl. He was also an avid handball player and won many championships, playing well into his 60s. One of his sons is the anthropologist Dr. Lars Krutak.
