= Eastern New Mexico University =

Public university in Portales, New Mexico, US

Coordinates: 34°10′37″N 103°20′55″W

- Former names: Eastern New Mexico Junior College (1927–1940); Eastern New Mexico College (1940–1949)
- Motto: Explore. Experience. Excel.
- Type: Public university
- Established: 1927; 99 years ago
- Academic affiliations: CONAHEC
- Chancellor: James N Johnston
- Faculty: 156 full-time and 83 part-time (Fall 2023)
- Students: 5,106 (3,833 undergraduate) (Fall 2023)
- Location: Portales, New Mexico, United States
- Campus: Suburban/small town, 433 acres (1.75 km^{2}) (main campus)
- Colors: Green & silver
- Nickname: Greyhounds
- Sporting affiliations: NCAA Division II – Lone Star
- Website: enmu.edu
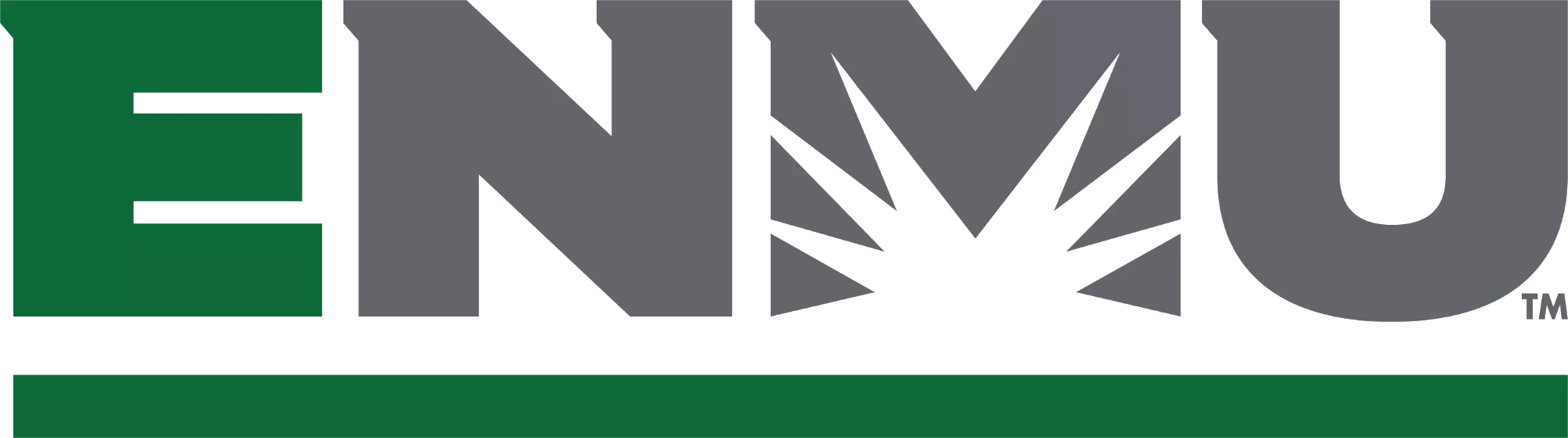

Eastern New Mexico University (ENMU or Eastern) is a public university with a main campus in Portales, New Mexico, and two associate degree-granting branches, one at Ruidoso and one at Roswell. ENMU is New Mexico's largest regional comprehensive university and is the most recently founded state university in New Mexico (legislated in 1927, opened in 1934). It is a federally designated Hispanic-serving institution and a member of the Hispanic Association of Colleges and Universities. The ENMU System consists of three campuses.

== History ==
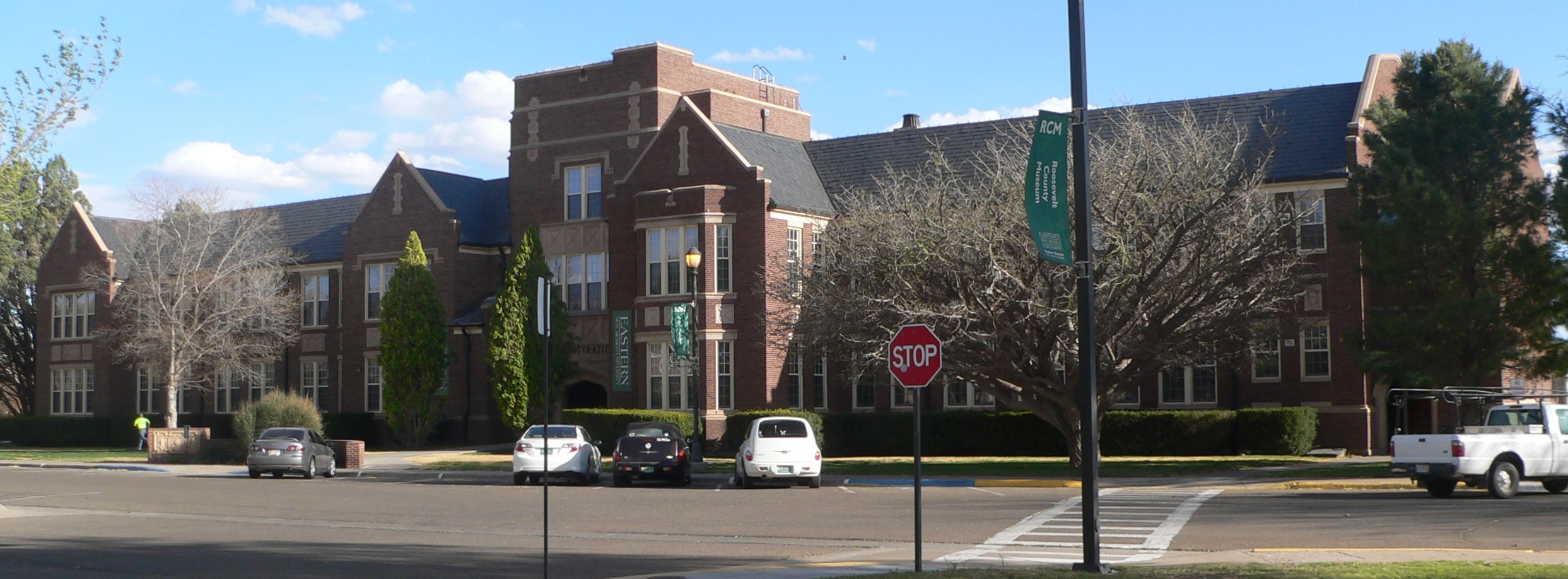
Main administration building

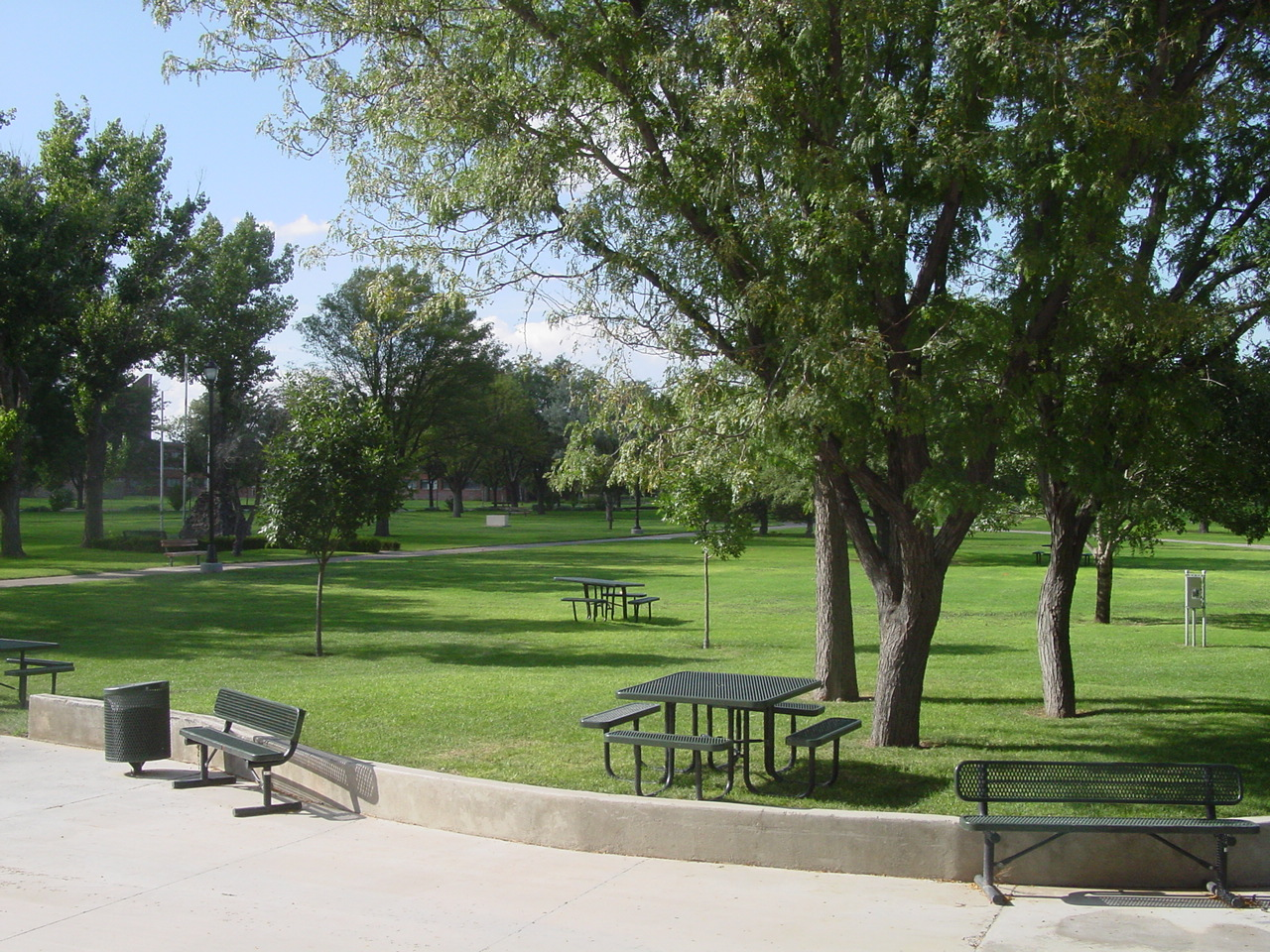
A view of the main quad of ENMU.

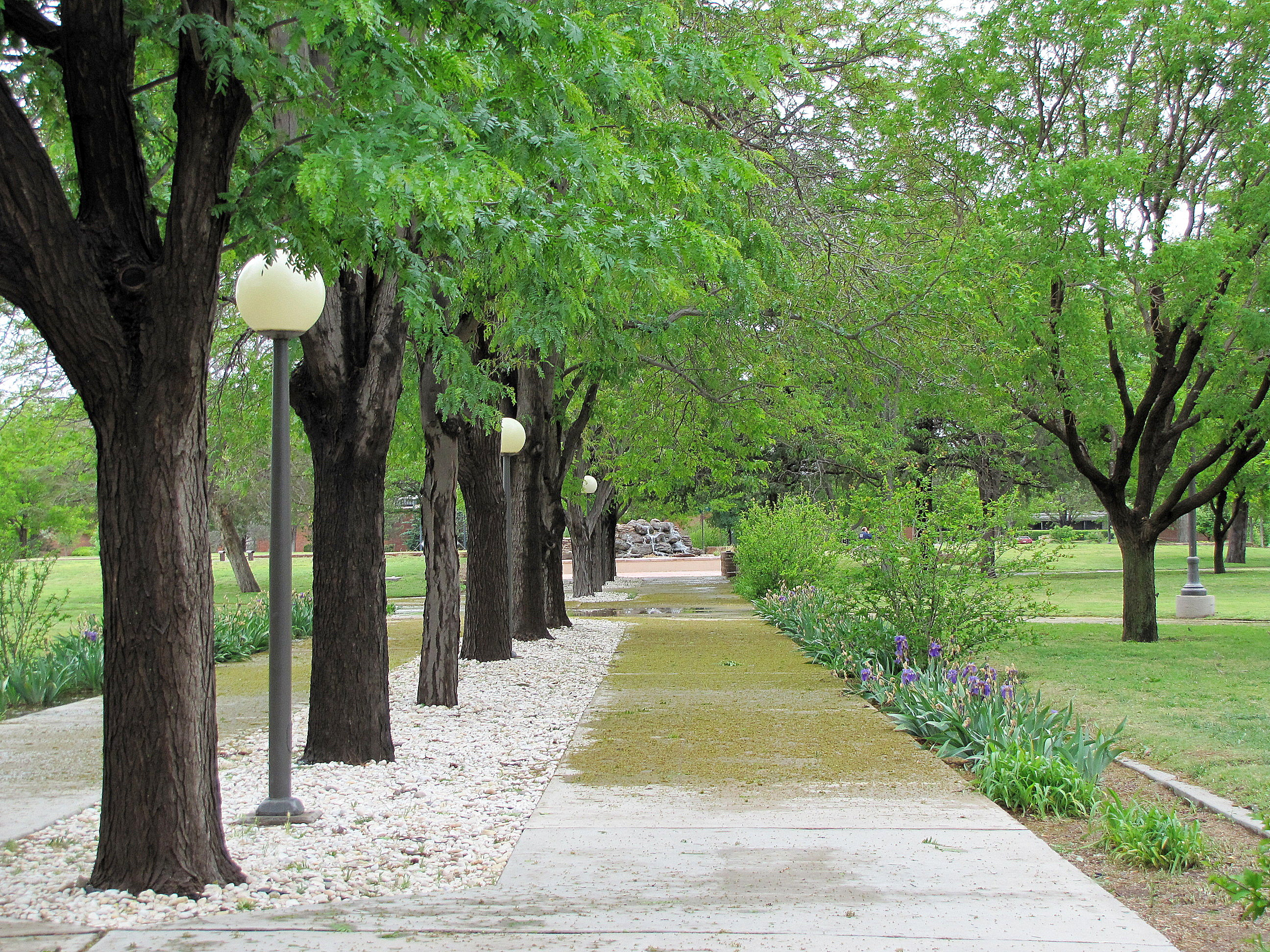
Central campus walkway

The New Mexico legislature approved the construction and staffing of a normal school in eastern New Mexico in 1927, and approved appropriation for construction in 1929, but the Stock Market Crash of 1929 and the Great Depression hindered the school's opening, which was delayed until 1934 (construction had begun in 1931).

From 1934 to 1940, the institution, first named Eastern New Mexico Junior College (ENMJC) operated as a community college. In 1940, the third and fourth years of college were first offered, leading to a bachelor's degree, and the institution was renamed Eastern New Mexico College (ENMC). ENMC was accredited by the North Central Association of Colleges and Secondary Schools as a four-year liberal arts college in 1946–47. Graduate work leading to the master's degree in some departments was added in 1949, and on April 5, 1949, the board of regents approved the change of the institution's name to Eastern New Mexico University.

== ENMU System ==
ENMU's main campus (ENMU-Portales), consisting of over 400 acres (1.6 km^{2}), is located in Portales on the extreme eastern border of New Mexico, in the Eastern New Mexico/Llano Estacado region about halfway between the northern and southern boundaries of the state. (Portales is 90 miles (140 km) northeast of Roswell, 120 miles (190 km) southwest of Amarillo, Texas, and 110 miles (180 km) northwest of Lubbock, Texas.) ENMU owns KENW (TV) and KENW-FM, a public television and radio station that are housed and operated on the main campus. The president of ENMU-Portales also serves as the chancellor for the ENMU System.

The ENMU Ruidoso Campus, ENMU-Ruidoso, is a community college (one of 18 in New Mexico) and an official branch of ENMU (branch status being granted in July 2005). Undergraduate and graduate coursework completed at the ENMU-Ruidoso campus is transferable for credit toward an undergraduate or graduate degree at ENMU-Portales, and, typically other undergraduate/graduate institutions in the United States. In 1991, the Ruidoso location had been established as the ENMU Ruidoso Branch Community College and offered two-year college academic and vocational programs. ENMU-Ruidoso offers Certificates of Completion, Associate of Science, Associate of Arts, and Associate of Applied Science degrees, as well as community education classes, customized training workshops, and adult basic education courses. It operates a One-Stop Career Center which provides free employment services for employers and job seekers in Lincoln County. The center offers both an academic and vocational curriculum. (Ruidoso is located southwest of Portales, in a mountainous region of south-central New Mexico.)

The ENMU Roswell Campus, ENMU-Roswell, also a two-year branch, offers a wide variety of programs. ENMU-Roswell was established in the fall of 1958. In the spring of 1967, the institution moved to twelve buildings on 241 acres (0.98 km^{2}) of the former Walker Air Force Base. Roswell is one of New Mexico's larger cities, located in the southeast section of the state.

ENMU also offers online degrees. ENMU's online degrees in the fields of business and education are the most affordable in the U.S.

== Academic organization ==
ENMU-Portales consists of four colleges and a graduate school:

- College of Business
- College of Education and Technology
- College of Fine Arts
- College of Liberal Arts and Sciences

=== Golden Student Success Center ===
The Golden Student Success Center (GSSC) construction was completed in 2018 replacing the original Golden Library building. The building now houses the Golden Library, the Runnels Gallery and the offices of Tutoring and Supplemental Instruction and Distance Learning.

Golden Library

The Golden Library features General Collections, Special Collections and Government Information. Special Collections includes the Jack Williamson Science Fiction Library, Southwest Collection (including New Mexico collections), University archives, and local history. The General Collection includes newspapers, serials, juvenile books, and K-12 curriculum materials.

Jack Williamson Science Fiction Library

The Jack Williamson Science Fiction Library is part of the Special Collections and has a science fiction collection with over 30,000 volumes, including science fiction books, science fiction pulp magazines, manuscripts, correspondence, and photographs.

== Museums ==
=== Dr. Antonio Gennaro Natural History Museum ===
The Dr. Antonio Gennaro Natural History Museum is affiliated with the ENMU Department of Biology. The purpose of the museum is to educate the public about the diversity of life while emphasizing the natural heritage of eastern New Mexico and the greater Southwest, particularly the Llano Estacado. Formerly known as the Eastern New Mexico University Natural History Museum, the museum was renamed and dedicated to Dr. Gennaro in spring 2016. In addition to the taxidermy and study skins on display, the museum features a live animal exhibit with both native and non-native species. Gennaro came to ENMU in 1966 as an associate professor of biological sciences and went on to become a nationally recognized researcher. He started ENMU's vertebrate collection for the museum. He authored and published two books, Nature's Way and Wildlife Falsehoods.

=== Blackwater Draw Museum ===
The original Blackwater Draw Museum opened in 1969 to display artifacts uncovered at the Blackwater Locality No. 1 site and illustrate life at the Blackwater Draw site during the Clovis period (over 13,000 years ago) through the recent historic period.

=== Miles Mineral Museum ===
The Miles Mineral Museum features a comprehensive collection of geological specimens representative of the Pecos River valley area, as well as a sampling of specimens from other regions, including several meteorites. The bulk of the objects contained within the museum were once part of the private collection of amateur geologists and mineral enthusiasts, Fred and Gladys Miles. ENMU purchased the [approximately] 2,500 piece collection of geological, archaeological, and anthropological specimens from the couple in 1967. Many additional specimens have been added to the museum over the years since that time. The entire collection was originally displayed at a single ENMU facility named the Miles Museum, which opened in 1969. In 1984 the objects in the collection were divided up into two categories, and two separate museums were formed to display them; the Miles Mineral Museum and the Miles Anthropology Museum. The Miles Mineral Museum is now located in Roosevelt Hall, adjacent to the Dr. Antonio Gennaro Natural History museum, on the ENMU campus.

Mr. Fred Miles and Mrs. Gladys Miles began collecting mineral and fossil specimens along the Pecos River after they moved to Roswell, New Mexico, in 1928. They were prolific collectors for 40 years, scouring the Pecos River valley for specimens. They particularly enjoyed finding native American artifacts and a specific type of quartz crystal formation referred to as Pecos Diamonds. For several decades they displayed the majority of their enormous collection at a Texaco service station in Roswell operated by Mr. Miles, who enjoyed showing it to inquisitive customers.

=== Miles Anthropology Museum ===
The Miles Anthropology Museum is home to various anthropological and archeological specimens collected by amateur anthropologists Fred and Gladys Miles, as well as to other collections from digs in the region. The private collection of Mr. and Mrs. Miles was also used as the foundation of the Miles Mineral Museum. Both museums are located in Roosevelt Hall.

== Student life ==
Undergraduate demographics as of Fall 2023
Race and ethnicity	Total
Hispanic	45%
White	37%
Black	5%
International student	3%
Two or more races	3%
Unknown	3%
American Indian/Alaska Native	2%
Asian	1%
Economic diversity
Low-income (Note: The percentage of students who received an income-based federal Pell grant intended for low-income students.)	41%
Affluent (Note: The percentage of students who are a part of the American middle class at the bare minimum.)	59%

== Athletics ==
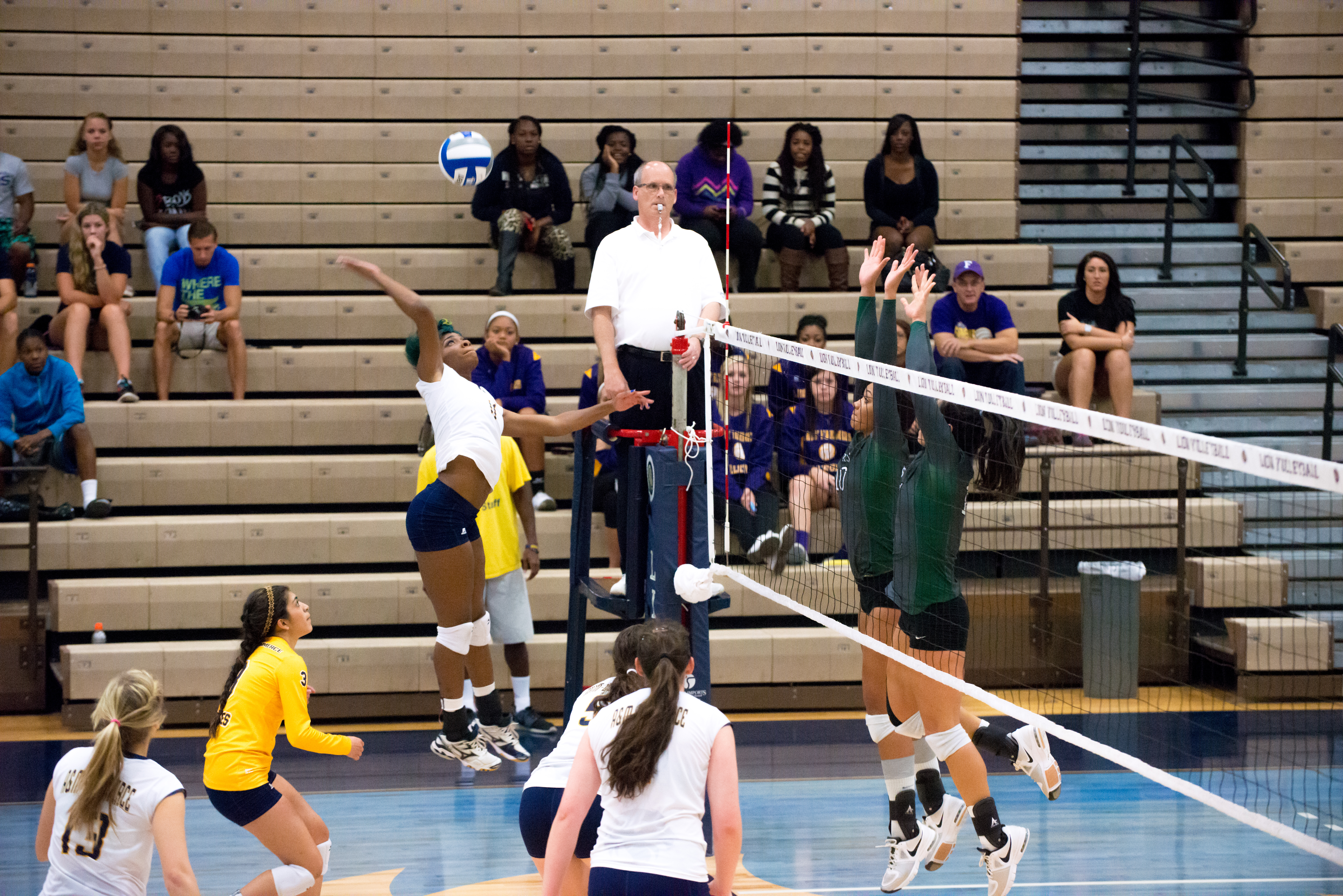
The Zias volleyball team in action against the Texas A&M–Commerce Lions in 2014

ENMU's athletic teams participate in the NCAA Division II Lone Star Conference. The men's and women's teams are nicknamed the Greyhounds. Prior to 2015, the women's teams were nicknamed the Zias. In early 2015, students, faculty, and staff voted to discontinue the Zia nickname and the women's teams become Greyhounds alongside the men's teams. ENMU vacated five seasons of wins in several sports starting from the 2008–09 season after the university self-reported over 100 eligibility violations.

== Greek life ==
ENMU currently features two active associated social fraternities and two active associated social sororities. Historically, the school featured several additional social fraternities. The school also features several honors fraternities.

== Notable alumni ==
=== Athletics ===
- Dana Altman, basketball coach
- Mike Boit, runner
- Don Carthel, football coach
- Jon Dalzell, American-Israeli basketball player
- Benjy Dial, football player
- Gerald Dockery, football player
- Mark Fox, basketball coach
- Conrad Hamilton, football player
- Derrick Harden, football player
- Larry Harris
- Larry Hays
- Greg Hyder, basketball player
- Pete Jaquess, football player
- Steve Kragthorpe, football player and coach
- Matt Simon, football player and coach
- Mike Sinclair, football player
- Bill Snyder, football coach
- Steve Spray, golfer

=== Film and television ===
- Ronny Cox
- Steven Michael Quezada
- Daryush Shokof

=== Government ===
- Juan Babauta
- Mickey D. Barnett
- Robert C. Brack
- Edward L. Chavez
- Sharon Clahchischilliage
- Anna Crook
- Candy Ezzell
- Ed Foreman
- Miguel Garcia
- Carroll Leavell
- James Madalena
- Katherine D. Ortega
- Stevan Pearce
- Dennis Roch
- Clemente Sanchez
- Louis E. Saavedra

=== Law ===
- John E. Douglas
- Arthur M. Dula

=== Literature and publishing ===
- Michael Blake
- Diana Ossana
- Jack Williamson

=== Science ===
- Clyde Snow

== Notable faculty ==
- Jeffrion L. Aubry
- Bobby Baldock
- Harold Elliott
- Paul Krutak
- Greg Lyne
- Jack Scott
- Christopher Stasheff
