= Elle Festin =

American tattoo artist

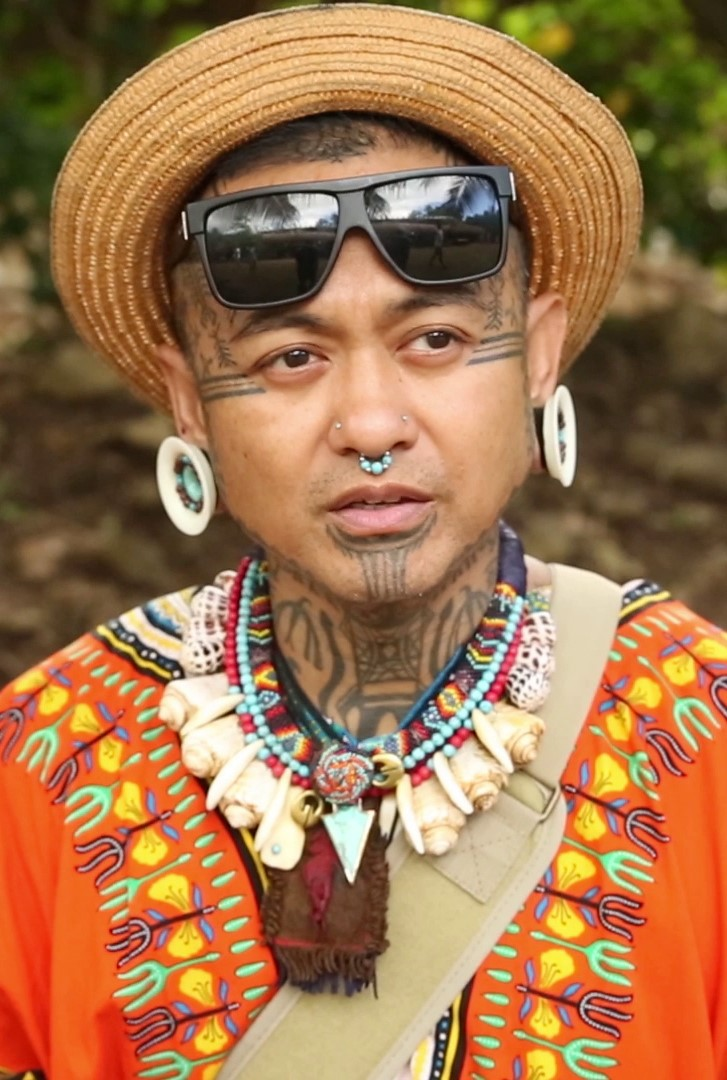
- Known for: Tattoo artist
- Movement: Mark of the four waves tribe
- Spouse: Zelle Festin
- Website: https://www.spiritualjourneytattoo.com/elle

Elle Festin is an American tattoo artist of Filipino origin. In 1997 he created the Tatak ng Apat na Alon tribe (Mark of the Four Waves), a transnational collective that popularized traditional Filipino tattooing around the world.

== Biography ==
Elle Festin was born and raised in the Philippines. His family emigrated to the United States when he was a teenager.

In 1997 Elle Festin and some Filipino friends went on a trip to Hawaii where they met native Hawaiians proud of their culture who proudly displayed traditional tattoos. He then decided to get a tattoo and found himself in the studio of the famous Tahitian tattoo artist Po'oino, Dwayne Johnson's tattoo artist. Following this meeting, Elle Festin set out in search of Filipino tattoo traditions, which were then on the verge of extinction.

Elle then founded the tribe of the four waves (in reference to the four waves of immigration which populated the Philippines). The collective soon brought together several hundred people from the Filipino diaspora, who all share a thirst to know more about their Filipino origins.

Elle Festin apprenticed in electric tattoo machines with Big Rock, former owner of Speezy Tattoo in Los Angeles. He began to tattoo the members of the collective with a machine. In 2003 he switched to traditional instruments, then began to design his own tools.

In 2008, as part of the filming of the episode of Lars Krutak's series Tattoo Hunter dedicated to the Philippines, Elle Festin and his wife Zel traveled to the Kalinga province to meet Whang-od, the last traditional tattoo artist. While she was apprehensive, she held a grand ceremony and asked him to tattoo her. Elle Festin says in the film: “It was an incredibly inspiring experience and now, more than ever, I feel deep in my heart that I should continue this renewal for her and for the many others who are searching for their culture and their roots. I want to expose the great depth and beauty of tribal tattooing because the tribal pieces we make here at Spiritual Journey are not pieces of flash art that you see on the walls of other shops. Rather, we create a art that has an energy and life of its own and our customers are drawn to it because it contains many layers of meaning."

In 2018 a delegation of around thirty members of the tribe met all the masters of traditional indigenous tattooing on the island of Moorea in French Polynesia. For a whole week they exchange, dance and tattoo each other.

In 2021 Elle Festin is the subject of the third episode of the documentary series Skinindignous.

== Filmography ==
- Tattoo Hunter: Philippines. By Kim MacKarrie and Ciara Byrne. 44 mins. Half Yard Productions 2009.
- Mark of the four waves tribe. By Jonathan Bougard. 26 mn. In Vivo Prod 2019
- Elle Festin. Written and directed by Sara Ben-Saud. 2021
