= Ell Pond (Rhode Island) =

Pond in Rhode Island, USA

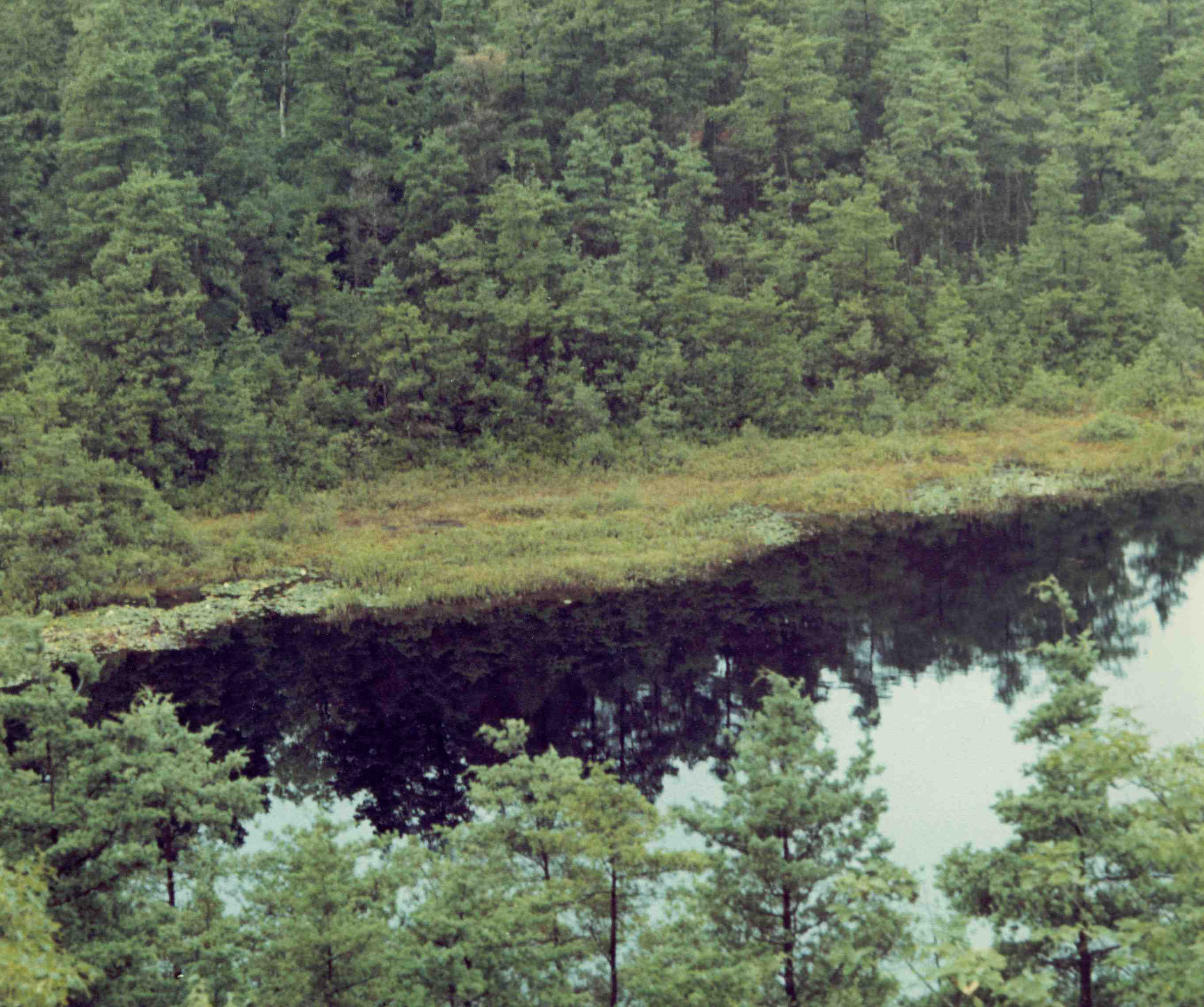
- Ell Pond in Rhode Island.

- Location within Rhode Island
- Location: Hopkinton, Rhode Island
- Coordinates: 41°30′19″N 71°46′58″W
- Area: 50 acres (20 ha)
- Established: 1972

U.S. National Natural Landmark
- Designated: 1974

Ell Pond is a kettle hole in Hopkinton, Washington County, Rhode Island. It is surrounded by a swamp of red maple and Atlantic white cypress, and by steep granitic monadnocks. The small area contains communities of both hydrophytic and xeric plants, which makes it ideal for ecological research and education. It was designated a National Natural Landmark in May 1974. In 1972, The Nature Conservancy purchased 50 acres (20 ha) including the pond to extend 218 acres (88 ha) of protected land owned by the Audubon Society of Rhode Island and the 1,002 acres (405 ha) of Rockville Wildlife Management Area owned by the state. The preserve is jointly managed by all three entities. There are hiking trails in the preserve, but Ell pond is specifically not reachable due to its fragile environment.

As of 2025, Ell Pond is the only listed National Natural Landmark in Rhode Island.
