= Ells (surname) =

Surname

Ells is a surname. Notable people with the surname include:

- Arthur F. Ells (1879–1963), American judge from Connecticut
- Glenn Ells (born 1934), Canadian politician
- Harry Leander Ells (1854–1943), American politician
- Roy Ells (1914–1979), Canadian politician
- Steve Ells (born 1966), American businessman

== See also ==
- Els (given name)
- Wells (name)
