= Ell (surname) =

Ell is a surname. Notable people with the surname include:

- Agnes Ell (1917–2003), New Zealand cricketer
- Bob Ell (born c. 1945), Australian property developer
- Carl Stephens Ell (1887–1981), American academic administrator
- Darrell Ell, Canadian curler and coach
- Harry Ell (1862–1934), New Zealand politician
- Jade Ell (fl. 1990s-present), Swedish musician
- Jimmy Ell (1915-2007), New Zealand cricketer
- Lindsay Ell (born 1989), Canadian musician
