= Elle Morgan =

- Birth name: Ellisa Freeman
- Also known as: DJ Elle Morgan
- Born: April 27, 2000 (age 25); Houston, Texas, United States
- Genres: House; tech house; progressive house; trance; electronica
- Occupation: DJ

Ellisa Freeman (born 2000), better known by her stage name Elle Morgan, is an American DJ based in Houston, Texas. She gained recognition performing alongside Sultan + Ned Shepard, LA Riots and Steve Aoki at local clubs.

== Biography ==
At the age of nine, Freeman became inspired when her parents took her to her first concert to watch Tiësto perform. At the age of eleven, she 'begged' her parents to buy her DJ equipments needed for her to start learning. Her father, who owns a roofing and restoration business, taught her the equipment's basics via instruction manuals. She opened a nightclub for children aged nine to fifteen called Elle's House, which is held in a section of an indoor kid's party venue in Woodland, Texas called Pump It Up. During April 2014 her debut single "Starkidz" was released.
