= Elle Kaplan =

American entrepreneur

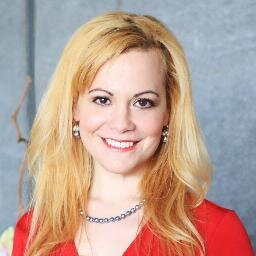
- Education: University of Michigan (BA), Columbia University (MBA)
- Occupations: CEO & Founding Partner of LexION Capital

Elle Kaplan is an American entrepreneur. Kaplan is the chief executive officer and founding partner of LexION Capital, a New York-based fiduciary wealth management firm. Kaplan received her B.S. from the University of Michigan in English and chemistry, and her Executive MBA in finance from Columbia University.

Kaplan has been featured as a personal finance expert and entrepreneur in a variety of business and consumer publications. She has also been featured on a variety of radio shows and podcasts. Kaplan was named an Enterprising Woman of the Year in 2013 by Enterprising Women Magazine.

Kaplan has been featured as a keynote speaker for several entrepreneurial and business organizations, including Inc.'s 2013 GrowCo Conference and the U.S. Chamber of Commerce Center for Women in Business Summit 2014. Kaplan is also a business and finance columnist for Inc. Magazine. Since October 2012, she has been a bi-weekly correspondent on local and national news shows, speaking on topics ranging from saving for retirement to the state of unemployment.
