= Ell Pond (Massachusetts) =

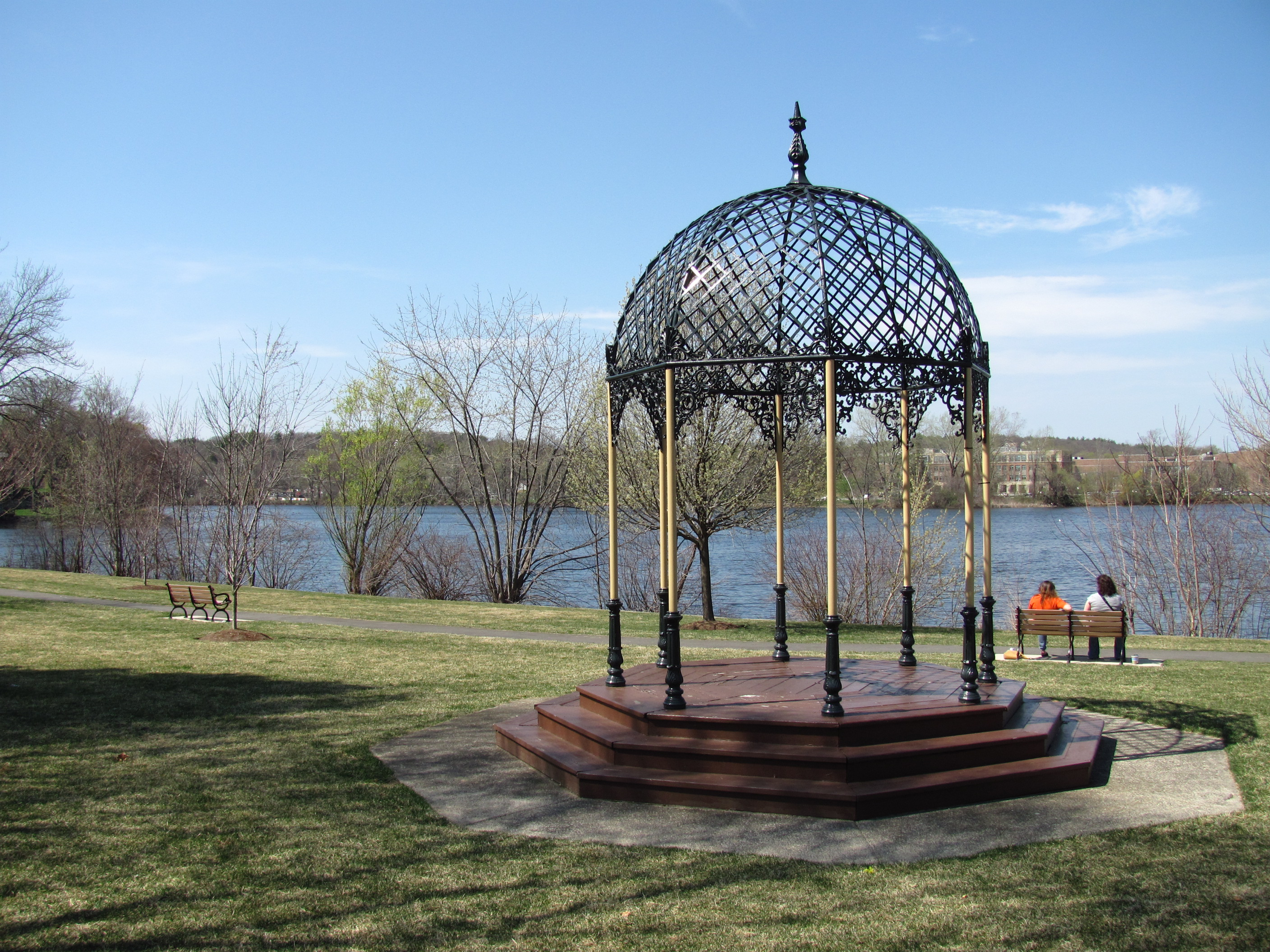
- Gazebo at Ell Pond in April 2010

- Location within Massachusetts
- Location: Middlesex County, Massachusetts
- Coordinates: 42.4607°N 71.0645°W
- Type: lake

Ell Pond is a lake in Middlesex County, in the U.S. state of Massachusetts. The pond is 0.3 miles (480 m) north of Melrose city center.

Ell Pond, formerly also written "L Pond", was so named on account of its L-shape. A variant name is "Crystal Pond".
