= Aela Callan =

German filmmaker

Aela Callan is a documentary filmmaker and journalist based in Berlin, Germany.

== Biography ==
Callan began her career in Perth at 6PR radio in 1999, before working in the Canberra press gallery, Sydney's 2UE radio. and Seven News in Sydney, New South Wales, Australia. In 2008, Callan won a Walkley Award, for excellence in Australian journalism. In 2013-14 Callan was selected for the John S. Knight Journalism Fellowships at Stanford where she studied ways to combat hate speech online in Myanmar. She was also the recipient of the Gold UNDPI Award at the New York Festivals Film and Television Awards in 2014, for her film "It's a Man's World," which appeared on the Al Jazeera Network's program 101 East

Between 2009 and 2013, Callan lived in Asia and filed reports for Channel Seven and Al Jazeera Television. The many events she covered include Myanmar's 2010 elections, the 2011 Japan earthquake and tsunami, and Thailand's 2010 violent street protests. Her documentary work has focused on topics around women's rights, and the environment
