= Stockholm Township, Crawford County, Iowa =

Stockholm Township
- Township
- Location in Crawford County
- Coordinates: 42°09′54″N 095°15′38″W
- Country: United States
- State: Iowa
- County: Crawford

Area
  - Total: 35.65 sq mi (92.34 km^{2})
  - Land: 35.63 sq mi (92.28 km^{2})
  - Water: 0.023 sq mi (0.06 km^{2}) 0.06%
- Elevation: 1,362 ft (415 m)

Population (2000)
  - Total: 231
  - Density: 6.5/sq mi (2.5/km^{2})
- GNIS feature ID: 0468753

Stockholm Township is a township in Crawford County, Iowa, United States. As of the 2000 census, its population was 231.

== Geography ==
Stockholm Township covers an area of 35.65 square miles (92.3 km^{2}) and contains no incorporated settlements. According to the USGS, it contains two cemeteries: Kiron and Saint Johns Lutheran.

The streams of Newcom Creek, Porter Creek, Trinkle Creek, Tucker Creek and Wheeler Creek run through this township.
