= Aella (Amazon) =

Amazon in Greek mythology

In Greek mythology, Aella (/ˈɑːɛllɑː/ or "AH-ell-ah; Ancient Greek: Ἄελλα, romanized: Aëlla, lit. 'whirlwind', 'tempest' or 'storm-swift') was an Amazon warrior who fought Heracles during his Ninth Labor (the fetching of the girdle of Queen Hippolyta). Diodorus Siculus highlights her exceptional swiftness, noting that she was the first Amazon to charge Heracles in battle.

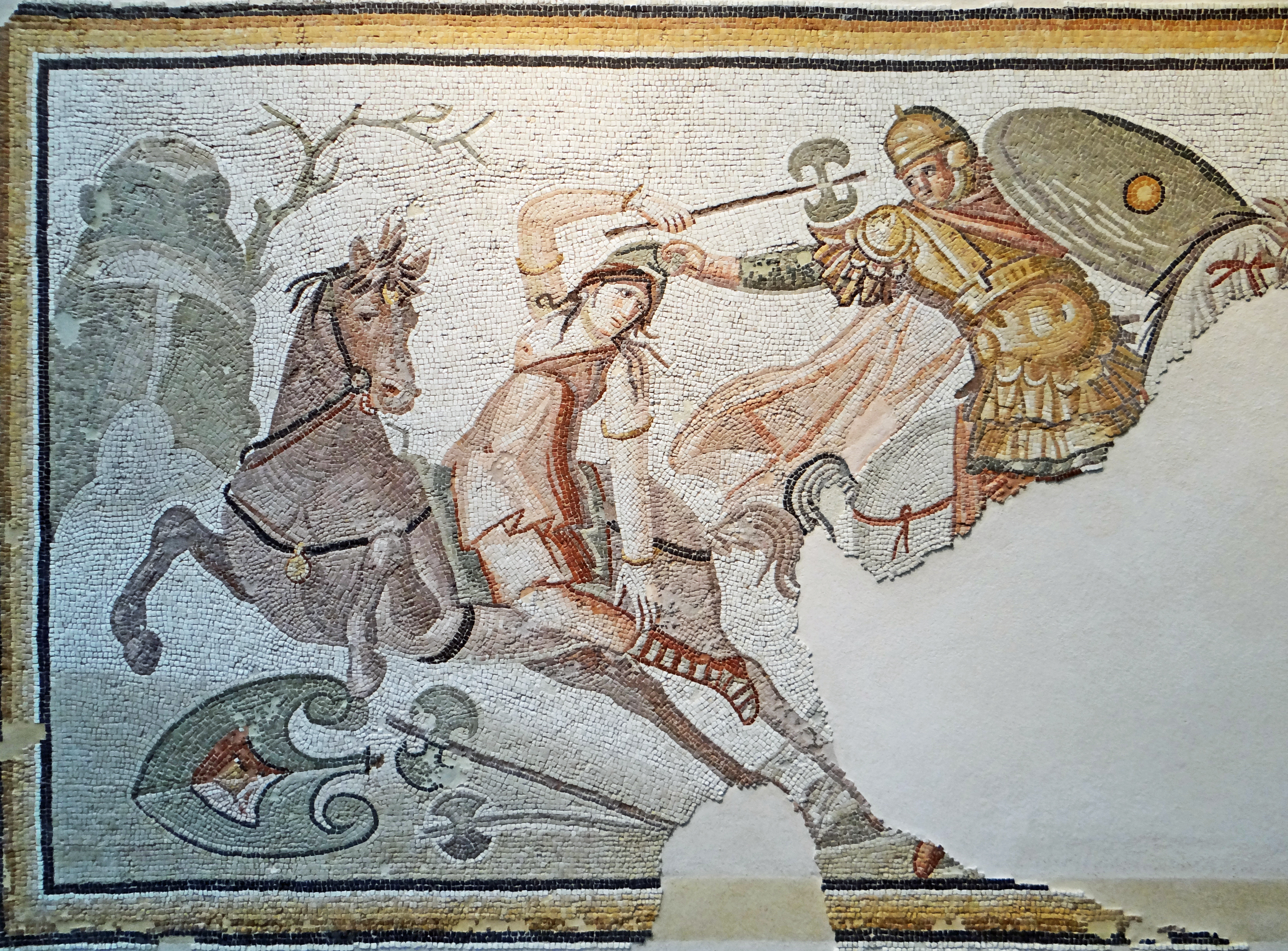
A hippeus rider seizes a mounted Amazon armed with a labrys by her Phrygian cap. This 4th-century AD Roman mosaic, from Daphne near Antioch-on-the-Orontes (present-day Antakya in Turkey), is housed in the Louvre in Paris.

== Family ==
The Amazons, daughters of the war god Ares and the nymph Harmonia, were renowned as fierce and independent women warriors. They were often depicted as residing in the region around the Black Sea, though their homeland's exact location varies in different accounts. Some ancient writers place the Amazons near the Thermodon River in modern-day Turkey, while others suggest Scythia or Libya.

== Mythology ==
Heracles' Ninth Labor, given by Eurystheus, was to retrieve the girdle of Queen Hippolyta for his daughter, Admete. Heracles sailed to the land of the Amazons and was initially welcomed by Hippolyta, who admired his heroism. However, Hera, in disguise, incited the Amazons to attack Heracles, leading to a battle. Aella, meaning "Whirlwind," was the first to charge Heracles. Despite her bravery, Heracles, wearing the Nemean lion skin, was invincible, and Aella was slain along with other Amazons.

== Mentions in Ancient Literature ==
Aella is mentioned by Diodorus Siculus in Bibliotheca historica 4.16.3:

"Now the general mass of the Amazons were arrayed against the main body of the followers of Heracles, but the most honoured of the women were drawn up opposite Heracles himself and put up a stubborn battle. The first, for instance, to join battle with him was Aella, who had been given this name because of her swiftness, but she found her opponent more agile than herself."
