= Lars Krutak =

North-American anthropologist, photographer and writer (born 1971)

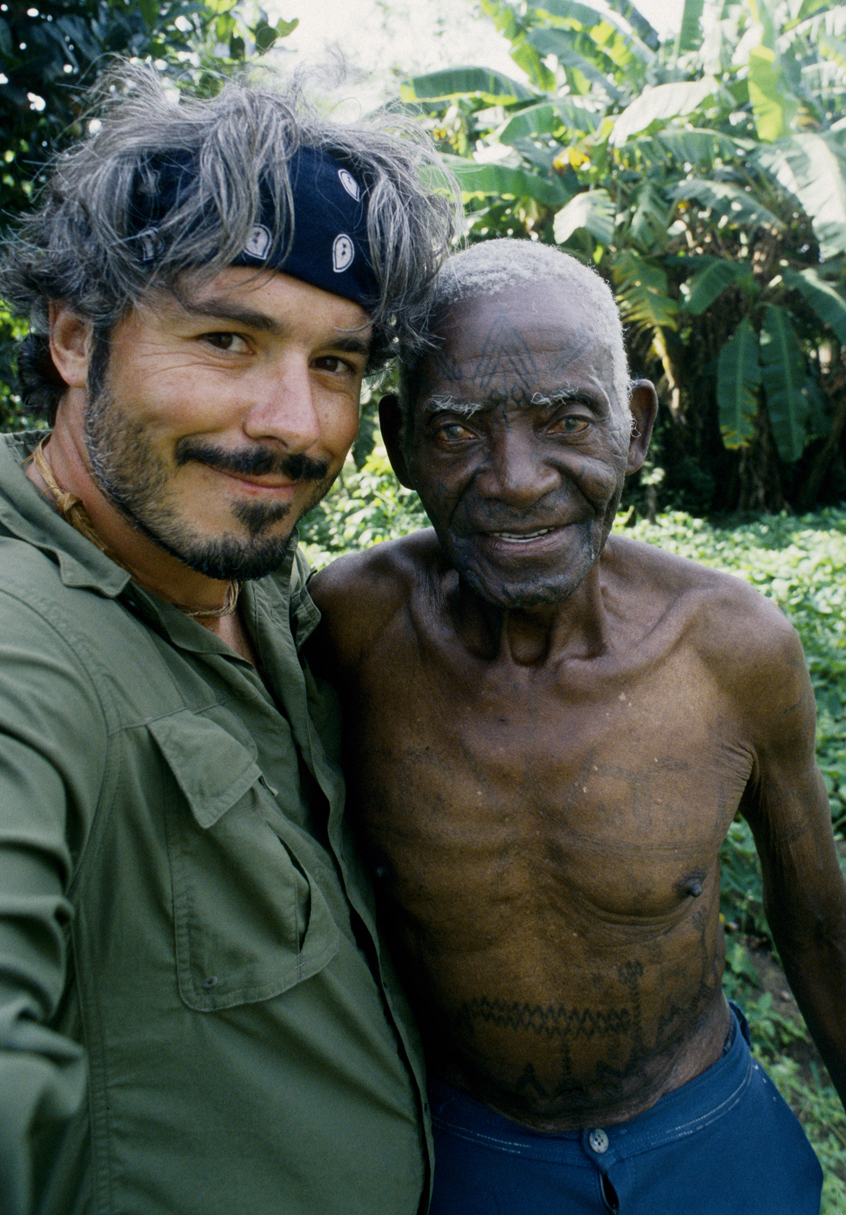
- Lars Krutak with Pius, one of the last Makonde tattoo masters of Mozambique
- Born: April 14, 1971 (age 55); Lincoln, Nebraska US
- Known for: Tattoo anthropology
- Scientific career
- Fields: Anthropology

Lars Krutak (April 14, 1971) is an American anthropologist, photographer, and writer known for his research about tattoo and its cultural background. He produced and hosted the 10-part documentary series Tattoo Hunter on the Discovery Channel, which traveled the indigenous world to showcase vanishing art forms of body modification. Between 1999-2002 and 2010–2014, Krutak worked as an Archaeologist and Repatriation Case Officer at the National Museum of the American Indian and National Museum of Natural History, facilitating the return of human remains, funerary objects, sacred and ceremonial objects. Today, he is a research associate at the Museum of International Folk Art.

== Early life and career ==
Krutak was born in Lincoln, Nebraska, to Dr. Paul Krutak (1934–2016), a traveling geologist and university professor, who moved the family to Mexico City in 1979 and then to a series of states including Louisiana, Texas, and eventually Colorado where he grew up in the small mountain town atmosphere of Rye, Colorado. Krutak attended the University of Colorado at Boulder studying art history and anthropology and upon graduation (1993) moved to San Francisco to work as an art gallery preparator for Paul Thiebaud, the son of American Pop artist Wayne Thiebaud. In 1996, Krutak attended graduate school at the University of Alaska at Fairbanks where his thesis One Stitch at a Time: Ivalu and Sivuqaq Tattoo focused on the ancient tattooing traditions of the St. Lawrence Island Yupik people.

Krutak briefly attended Cambridge University as a PhD student in 1998 but he returned stateside joining the National Museum of the American Indian (Smithsonian Institution) where he worked as a Repatriation Research Specialist (between 1999 and 2002) facilitating the return of sacred and ceremonial objects and human remains to indigenous peoples throughout North America and Mexico. Between 1998 and 2003 he also worked for the Organization for Security and Co-operation in Europe as a Democratization Analyst and Applied Anthropologist in several countries of the former Yugoslavia monitoring electoral reforms.

Since 2002, Krutak served as an Anthropological Consultant for three National Geographic Channel productions and was a co-recipient of the 2003 American Book Award in Literature for Akuzilleput Igaqullghet, Our Words Put to Paper Sourcebook in St. Lawrence Island Yupik Heritage and History. His PhD studies at Arizona State University (2005–2009) focused on the socioeconomic impacts of tourism on the Rarámuri (Tarahumara) people of Mexico's Copper Canyon region.

Krutak appeared as a studio guest for the History Channel's Ancient Aliens: Mysterious Rituals episode (2011) where he spoke about shamanism. In 2018, Krutak was the resident tattoo historian for the Facebook Watch series "Ink Expedition" produced by INSIDER. Later that year he was a studio guest for Netflix's "Explained" series episode on tattoo which was produced by VOX. Krutak has consulted with the motion picture industry, rendering services to "The Revenant" (2015) and "The Salvation" (2014). Krutak also works as a cultural consultant for leading gaming companies and franchises.

== Work ==
Published in 2007, Krutak's The Tattooing Arts of Tribal Women (ISBN 9781898948759) was the first book to focus on the tattooing artistry of Indigenous women worldwide. It is based on one decade of field and archival research.

In August 2010, Krutak released a new coffee table book with Edition Reuss on the ancient art of Kalinga tattooing in the Philippines entitled Kalinga Tattoo: Ancient and Modern Expressions of the Tribal (ISBN 9783934020863). With an introduction provided by tattooed Kalinga elder Ms. Natividad Sugguiyao, this book is the first volume to focus on the indelible arts of these Cordilleran people and is based on field research conducted in 2007 and 2008.

In his continued effort to understand how tattoos and other forms of body modification "make" the people who wear them, Krutak has acquired many traditional tattoos including hand-tapped work from the Iban of Borneo, Kalinga of the Philippines, Mentawai of Indonesia; hand-poked art from Theravada Buddhist monks in Thailand; and hand-pricked designs from the Kayabi of the Brazilian Amazon. He also wears approximately one thousand razor and knife-cut scars across his body received from other groups like the Kaningara of Papua New Guinea, Bétamarribé of Benin, the Hamar of Ethiopia, and the Makonde of Mozambique.

Krutak's tattoo research is regularly published internationally in magazines TätowierMagazin (Germany), Total Tattoo (UK) and Skin & Ink Magazine (USA). In September 2012, Lars' new book Magical Tattoos and Scarification: Spiritual Skin. Wisdom. Healing. Shamanic Power. Protection (ISBN 9783943105117) was released by Edition Reuss. This photographic masterwork explores the secret world of magical tattooing and scarification across the tribal world. Based on one decade of Dr. Krutak's field research among animistic and shamanic societies of Asia, Africa, the Americas, and Melanesia, Magical Tattoos and Scarification journeys into highly sacred territory to reveal how people utilize ritual body modification to enhance their access to the supernatural.

In 2013, Krutak's new work on Native American tattooing (i.e., Great Plains and Eastern Woodlands regions) was published by the University of Texas Press in the book Drawing With Great Needles: Ancient Tattoo Traditions of Eastern North America (Aaron Deter-Wolf and Carol Diaz-Granados, eds). Also that year, Krutak's research on ancient and contemporary practices of medicinal tattooing (including evidence on mummies) was published in the book Tattoos and Body Modification in Antiquity (Zurich Studies in Archaeology 9), edited by Philippe Della Casa and Constanze Witt.

Krutak's research on the history of Native North American tattoo, including contemporary revitalization movements, was published in the 2014 book Tattoo Traditions of Native North America: Ancient and Contemporary Expressions of Identity distributed by the University of Washington Press.

Krutak co-edited Ancient Ink: The Archaeology of Tattooing with Aaron Deter-Wolf. The book assembles the research of international scholars and tattoo artists. Published by the University of Washington Press in November 2017, Ancient Ink is the first book to explore the archaeological history of tattooing through ancient tools, tattooed mummies, and tattooed objects of material culture.

Krutak's new research on Naga tattooing of Northeast India and its ongoing revival was published in the 2020 release Tattoo Histories: Transcultural Perspectives on the Narratives, Practices, and Representations of Tattooing by Routledge. In 2020, Krutak with Dr. Dario Piombino-Mascali co-authored a peer-reviewed book chapter on global Indigenous therapeutic tattooing in relation to the Iceman in the tome Purposeful Pain: The Bioarchaeology of Intentional Suffering published by Springer.

In November 2024, Krutak's new book Tattoo Traditions of Asia was published by the University of Hawai'i Press. This work is the culmination of 20+ years of field and archival research and the first single volume on the subject. Traditional Hawaiian tattoo master Sulu'ape Keone Nunes reviewed this volume stating: "Traditional cultural practices are fast becoming endangered due to cross-pollination and westernization. Tattoo Traditions of Asia is an important resource for both those interested in understanding the foundations of tattooing and those who are committed to reclaiming a practice that has been ignored by dominant societies. This is a book long overdue."

In May 2025, Princeton University Press published Krutak's Indigenous Tattoo Traditions. This illustrated history of global Indigenous tattooing practices also features the work of several cultural tattoo practitioners - Jody Potts-Joseph (Hän Gwich'in), Elu (Zaza Alevi Kurdish), Mélissa Pizović (Bosnian), Dion Kaszas (Nlaka'pamux), Paninnguaq Pikilak (Greenlandic Inuit), Jemy and Kurapi Kaiabi (Kayabí), Julia Mage'au Gray (Mekeo), Turumakina Duley (Māori), Cudjuy Patjidres (Paiwan), Mo Naga (Uipo), Stacey Fayant (Métis/Nêhiyaw/Salteaux) and others - who are rebuilding a skin-marking legacy for future generations to come.

Krutak also serves as an Executive Producer and anthropological expert for the forthcoming film documentary Treasure of the Rice Terraces, which chronicles the story behind Filipino identity in relation to the tattoo revival of the Kalinga people of northern Luzon.

In February 2026, Krutak's article "One Mark at a Time: Ethnographic Notes on Tattooing" will open the Tattoo section of The Oxford Handbook of the Archaeology and Anthropology of Body Modification, which is perhaps the largest volume ever produced on the topic of ancient and more recent body modification practices.

== Preserving Culture ==
Krutak primarily focuses on documenting indigenous information on tattoos. He has attempted to uncover the social, religious, ontological, and medicinal values of tattoos through collaborative efforts. Krutak has conducted tattoo research with 50+ indigenous societies in 20+ countries.

== Therapeutic Tattooing ==
His examination of the therapeutic features of indigenous tattooing has been important, since to a great extent these cultural practices have been grossly underreported worldwide. The mummified remains of a Neolithic “Iceman, Otzi” found in Europe in 1991 is perhaps the best-known evidence of medicinal tattooing praxis as well as the oldest form of therapeutic tattooing yet preserved, and closely parallels classical Chinese acupuncture. More than fifty dark blackish-blue tattoos have been found at significant joints on his body, and radiographic examinations of Otzi’s remains uncovered substantial arthrosis in these tattooed areas (lumbar vertebrae, hip joints, knee joints, and lower limb joints). The St. Lawrence Island Yupiit and Unangan (Aleut) of Alaska likewise practiced joint-tattooing as a deterrent against ligament grievances and body pains. The therapeutic custom of tattooing the joints prevails among the Kayan of Sarawak, and are similar to that of Otzi in location and function.

The Unangan of the Aleutian Islands similarly “tattoo-punctured” to soothe joint paints. Unangan Atka Islanders utilized dampened thread covered in gunpowder to sew through pinched-up skin near an aching joint or over the back of a region of pain to relieve cases of migraines, eye disorders, and lumbago.

The efficacy of tattooing as a medical technology was also part of indigenous Ainu practices in Japan. The Yuki and Miwok of California also tattooed to relieve rheumatism and joint sprains.

== Cultural Heritage: St. Lawrence Island ==
St. Lawrence Island has featured a complexity of tattoo conventions encompassing some 2000 years. Prior to missionization, tattooing on St. Lawrence Island was a visual language that communicated the various ways Islanders engaged with their social, physical, and spiritual worlds. Tattooing here, as in every indigenous culture where tattooing was practiced, was a significant rite of passage. Numerous years elapsed before a woman acquired a full complement of tattoos that identified her family and clan group genealogy, social endeavors, and sometimes the achievements of relatives.

As a significant rite of passage, these tattoo were also ritualistic, since some markings were believed to cure infertility issues for women and/or they helped repel the advances of hostile spirits that were believed to be the harbingers of illness and disease.

Tattoo, as a therapeutic device, was frequently disease-specific. A few illnesses were "cured" with the placement of small lines or marks on or close to the distressed area. For example, tattoos placed over the sternum were believed to alleviate heart trouble, two small lines placed close to the eyes, temple, and forehead, might remedy headache or vision problems. Other medicinal marks were applied across the bodily surfaces by the shaman.

== Conservation and Restoration of Tattoos ==
Krutak's tattoo research is regularly shared with local communities when his projects and publications are completed, so that future generations have the necessary resources to revive, as needed, these ancient customs. After his Master's research in Alaska, he provided copies of his unpublished thesis to local Bering Strait libraries, organizations, families, and regional universities so this indelible history could be revisited at any time. Krutak also helped compile and edit the (2003) American Book Award-winning Akuzilleput Igaqullghet = Our Words Put to Paper: Sourcebook in St. Lawrence Island Heritage and History, and copies of this tome were provided to every household on this Alaskan island in Bering Strait. A pallet load of his (2010) book Kalinga Tattoo was shipped from Germany to Kalinga Province, Philippines, where it was distributed to local schools, educational institutions, and Kalinga elders. Studying the origins of tattooing allows individuals to discuss how tattoos have been a significant part of local identities for thousands of years. These ancient traditions represent one of the world's most important forms of cultural heritage.
