= Aelle =

Aelle, Ælle, Aella, or Ælla may refer to:

- Ælle of Sussex (also Aelle or Ella), king of Sussex (r. 477–514)
- Ælla of Deira (or Ælle; died 588), king of Deira
- Ælla of Northumbria (or Ælle or Aelle; died 867), king of Northumbria (r. 860s)

== See also ==
- Aela (disambiguation)
- Aello, one of the harpies
- Aella, a feminine name of Greek origin meaning stormswift
