= Boyer, Iowa =

- Unincorporated community
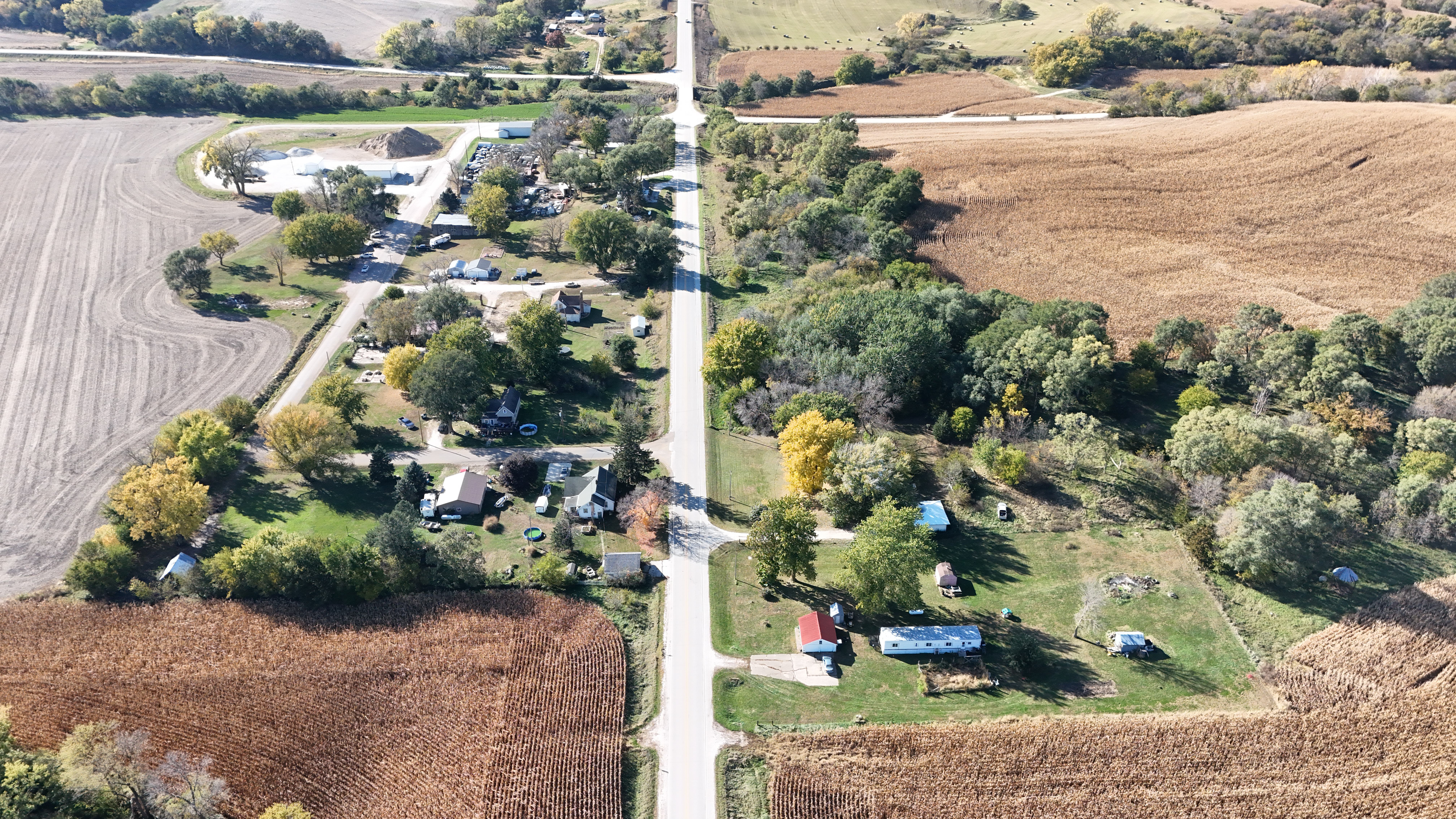
- Boyer, looking west along Avenue C

- Location within Iowa
- Coordinates: 42°10′55″N 95°14′07″W
- Country: United States
- State: Iowa
- County: Crawford

Government
  - Mayor: Gerald "Lard" Healy
- Elevation: 1,243 ft (379 m)
- Time zone: UTC-6 (Central (CST))
  - Summer (DST): UTC-5 (CDT)
- Area code: 712
- GNIS feature ID: 454787

Boyer is an unincorporated community in Crawford County, in the U.S. state of Iowa.

== History ==
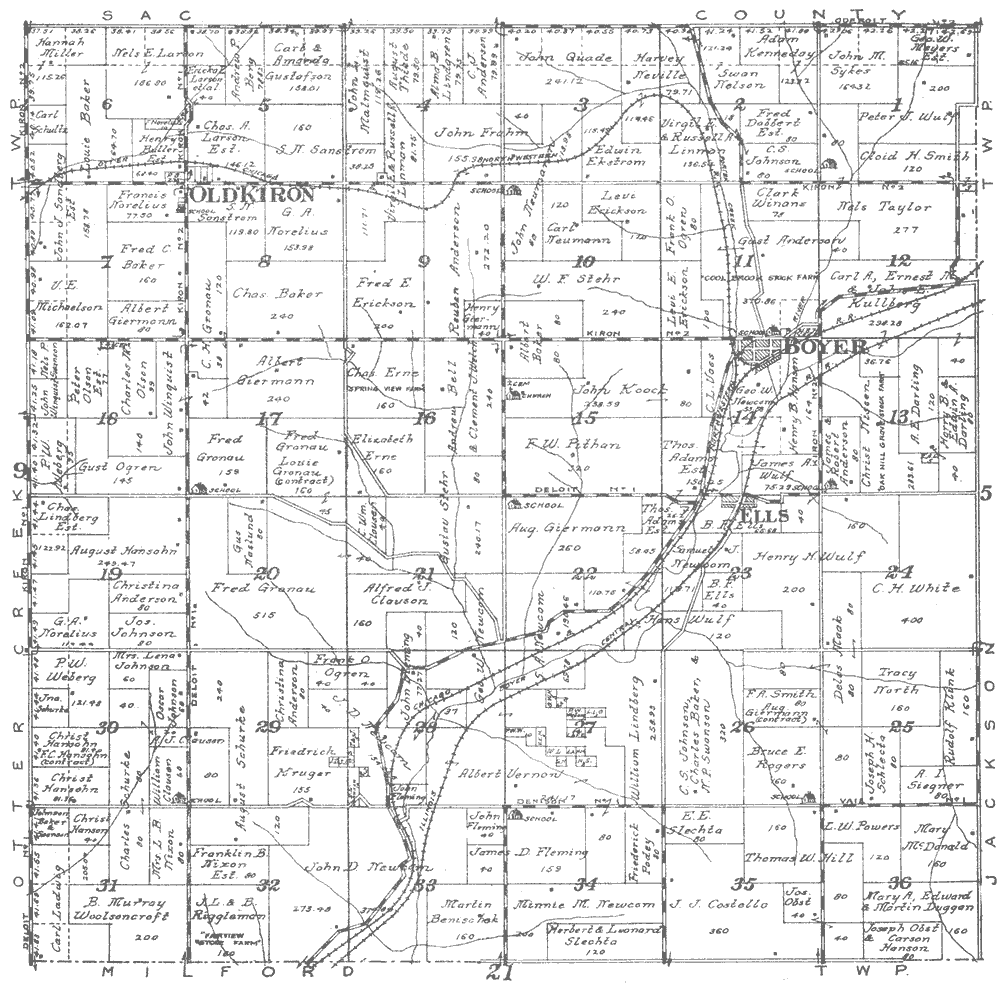
Stockholm Township, Iowa 1920, showing the location of Boyer, Old Kiron, and Ells.

Boyer was laid out in 1889. The community took its name from the Boyer River. Boyer's population was 60 in 1902, and 80 in 1925.

A post office called Boyer was established in 1899, and remained in operation until it was discontinued in 1967.

The population was 70 in 1940.
